= Fireplace =

Device for firing solid fuels in buildings

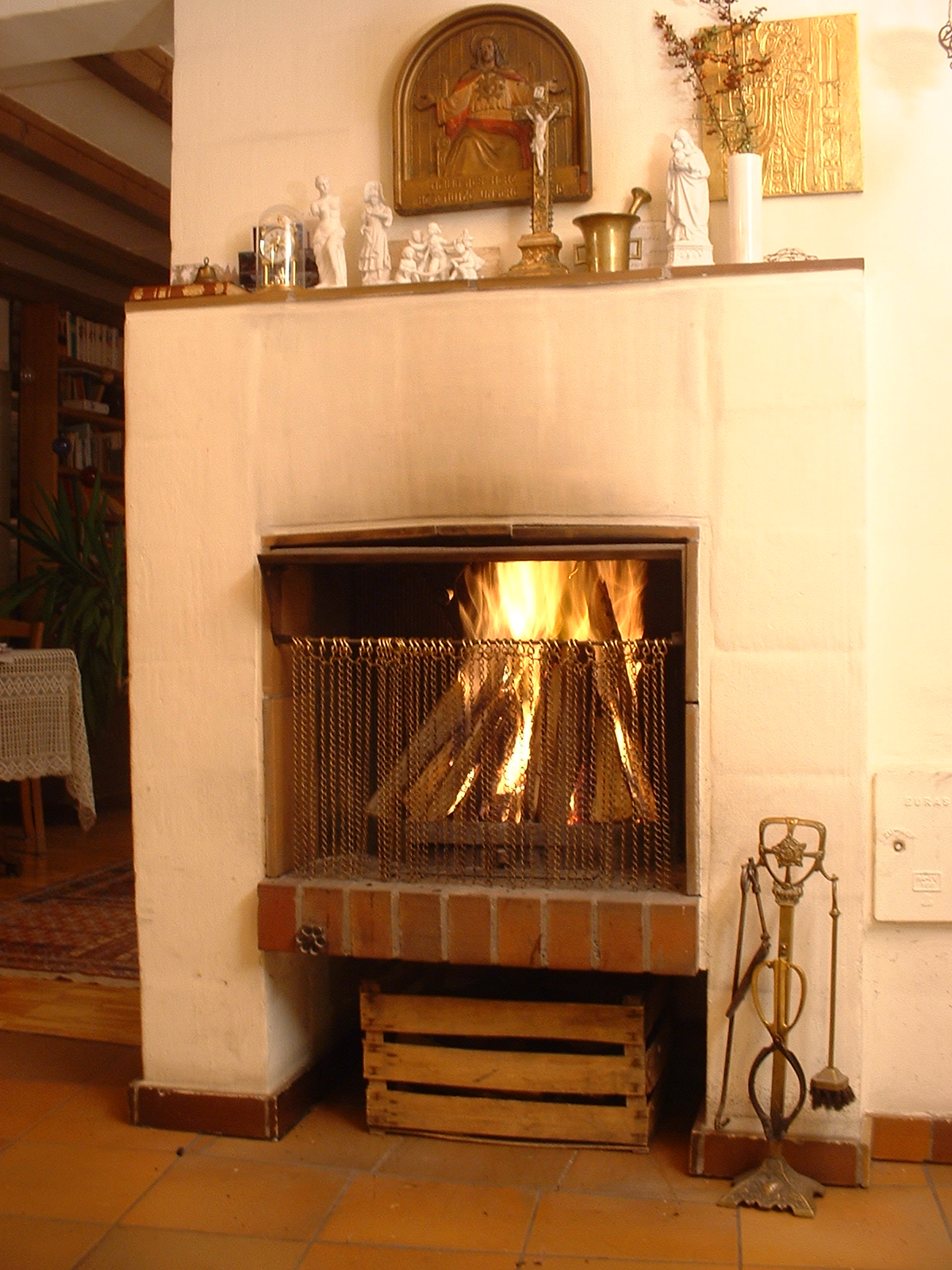
Modern open fireplace

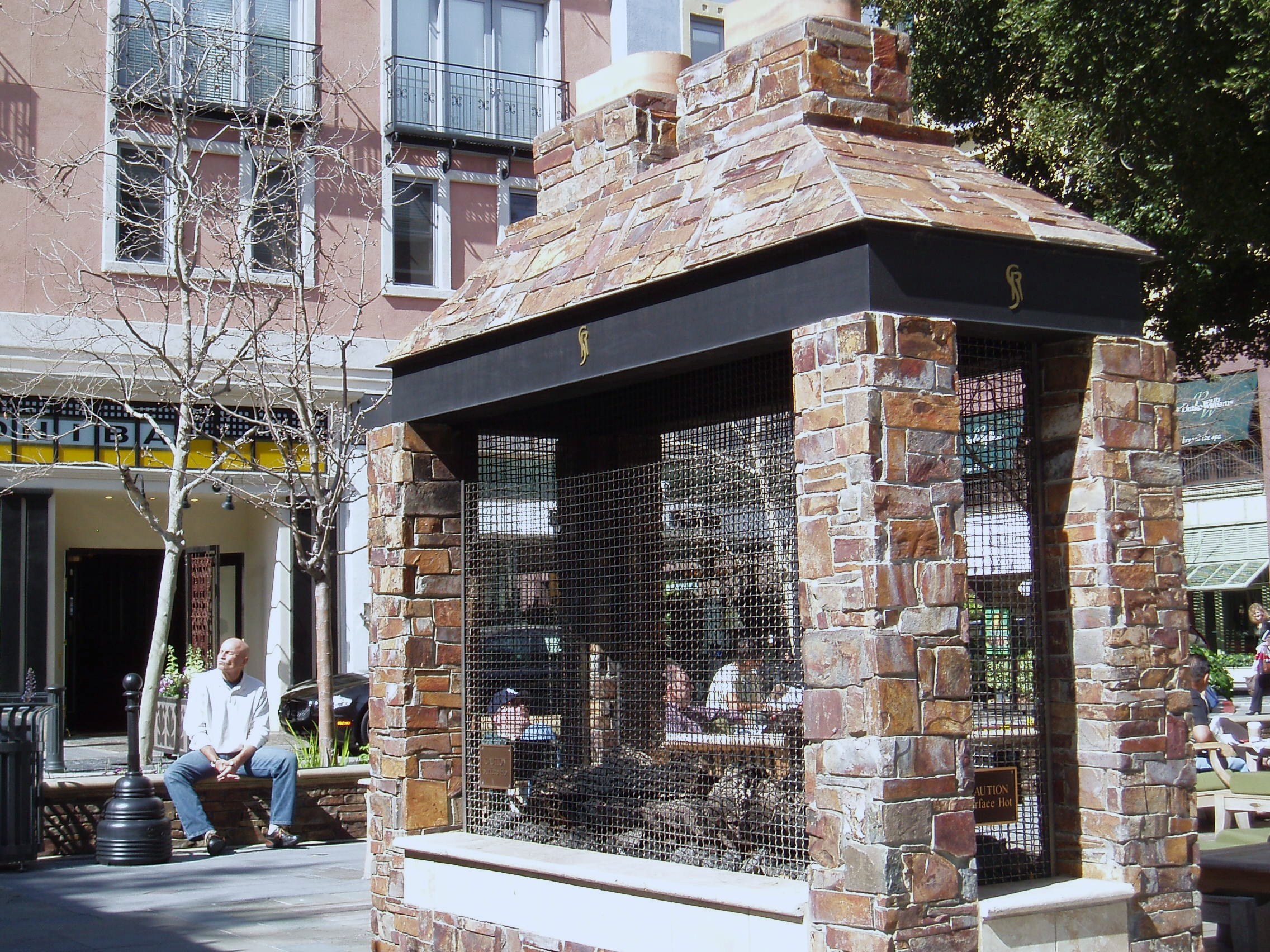
An outdoor fireplace

A fireplace or hearth is a structure made of brick, stone or metal designed to contain a fire. Fireplaces are used to heat a room or dwelling and also for the relaxing ambiance they create. Modern fireplaces vary in heat efficiency, depending on the design.

Historically, they were used for heating a dwelling, cooking, and heating water for laundry and domestic uses. A fire is contained in a firebox or fire pit; a chimney or other flue allows exhaust gas to escape. A fireplace may have the following: a foundation, a hearth, a firebox, a mantel, a chimney crane (used in kitchen and laundry fireplaces), a grate, a lintel, a lintel bar, an overmantel, a damper, a smoke chamber, a throat, a flue, and a chimney filter or afterburner.

On the exterior, there is often a corbelled brick or metal crown, in which the projecting courses act as a drip course to keep rainwater from running down the exterior walls. A cap, hood, or shroud serves to keep rainwater out of the exterior of the chimney; rain in the chimney is a much greater problem in chimneys lined with impervious flue tiles or metal liners than with the traditional masonry chimney, which soaks up all but the most violent rain. Some chimneys have a spark arrestor incorporated into the crown or cap.

Organizations like the United States Environmental Protection Agency (EPA) and the Washington State Department of Ecology warn that, according to various studies, fireplaces can pose health risks. The EPA writes "Smoke may smell good, but it's not good for you."

== Types of fireplaces ==
- Manufactured fireplaces are made with sheet metal or glass fire boxes.
- Electric fireplaces can be built-in replacements for wood or gas or retrofit with log inserts or electric fireboxes.
- A few types are wall mounted electric fireplaces, electric fireplace stoves, electric mantel fireplaces, and fixed or free standing electric fireplaces.

Masonry and prefabricated fireplaces can be fueled by:

- Wood fuel or firewood and other biomass
- Charcoal (carbonized biomass)
- Coal of various grades
- Coke (carbonized coal)
- Smokeless fuel of several types
- Flammable gases: propane, butane, and methane (natural gas is mostly methane, liquefied petroleum gas mostly propane)
- Ethanol (a liquid alcohol, also sold in gels)
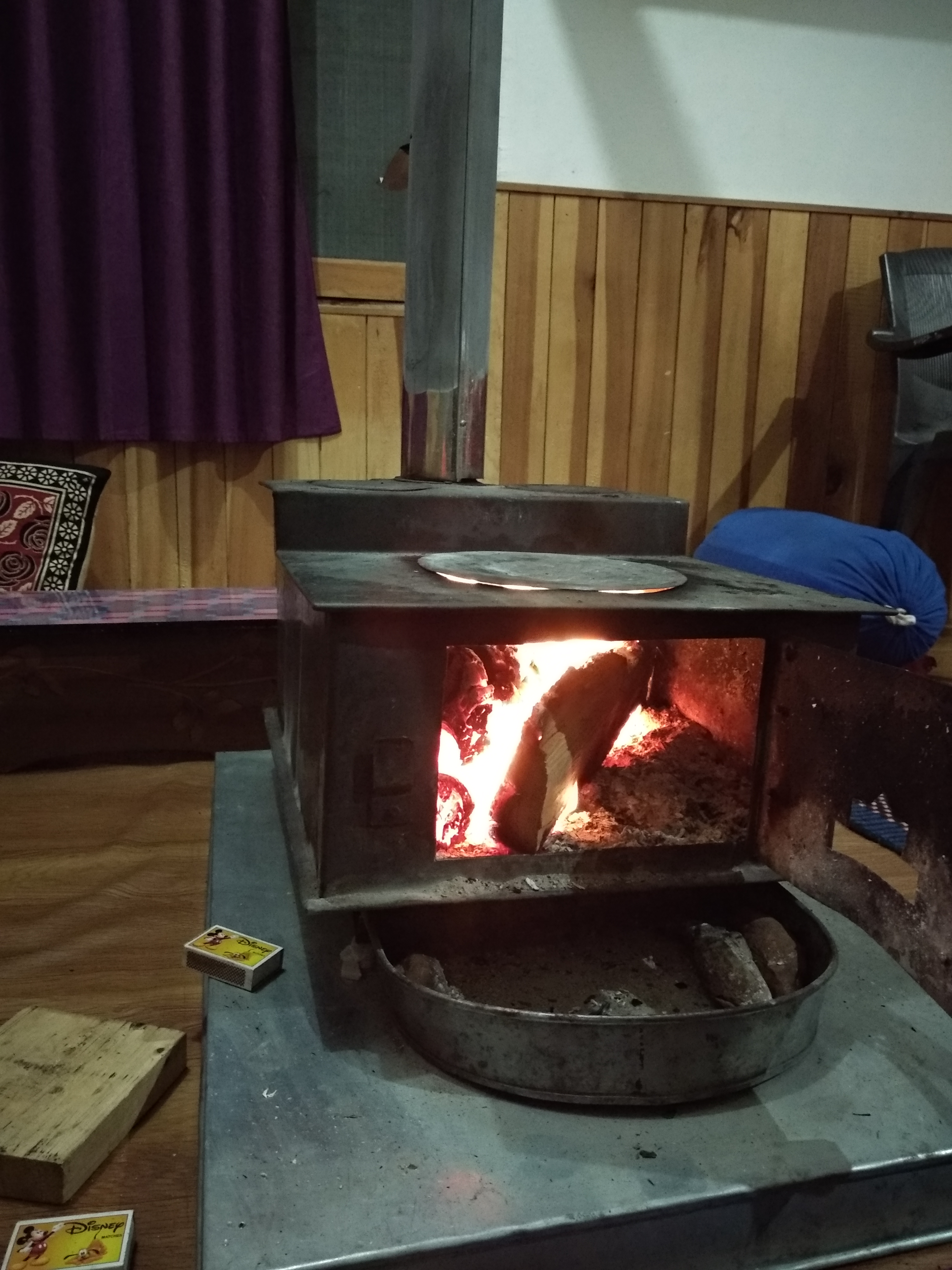
Traditional Himalayan Tandoor

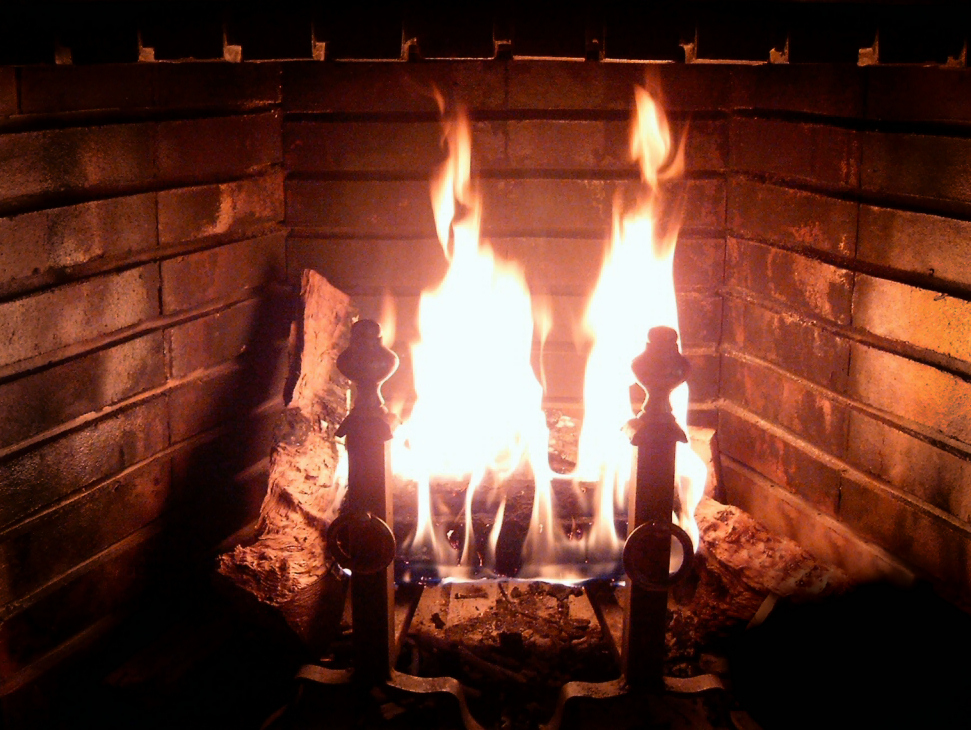
Wood-burning fireplace with fire dogs

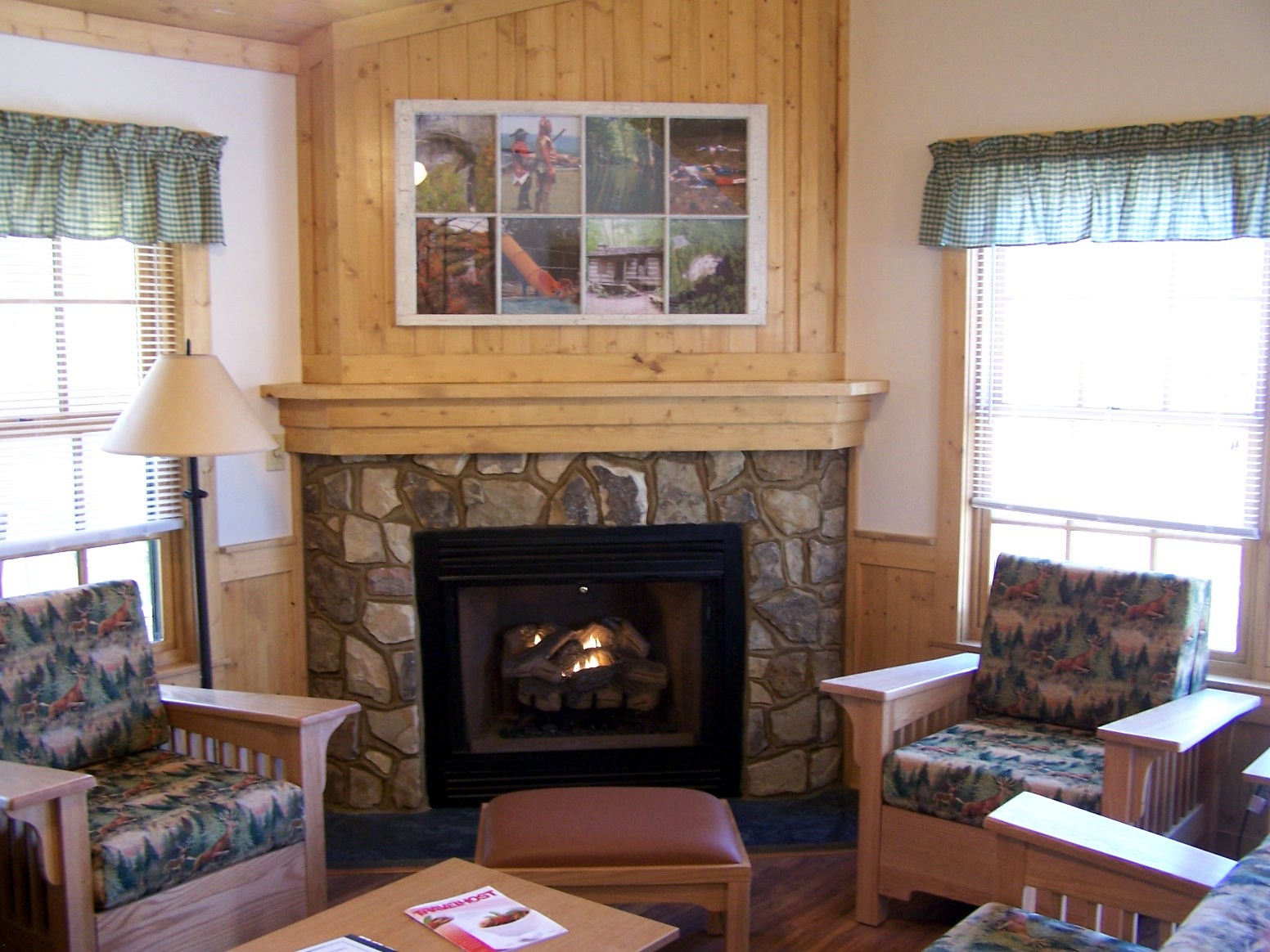
A gas-powered fireplace

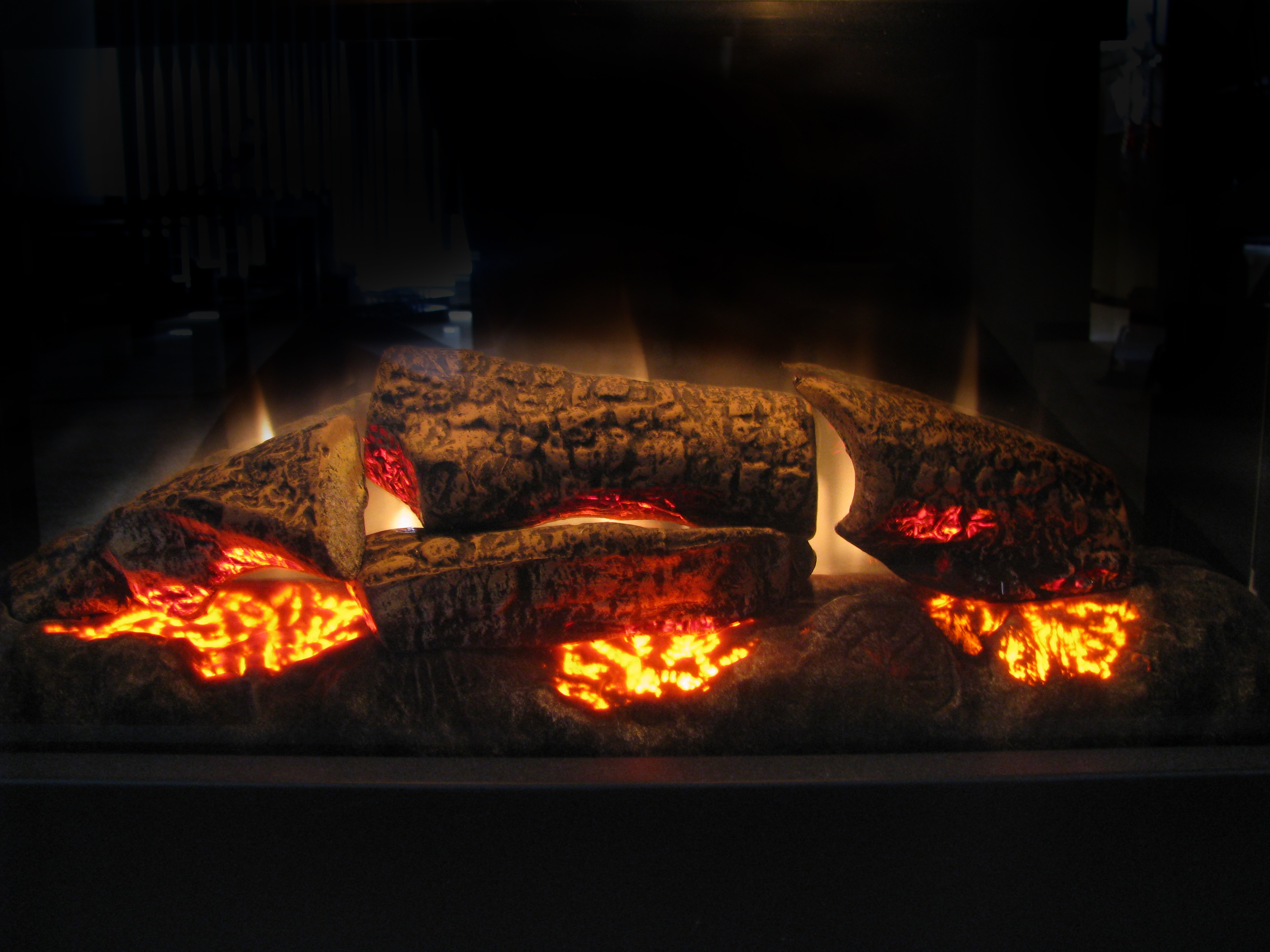
Electric fireplace

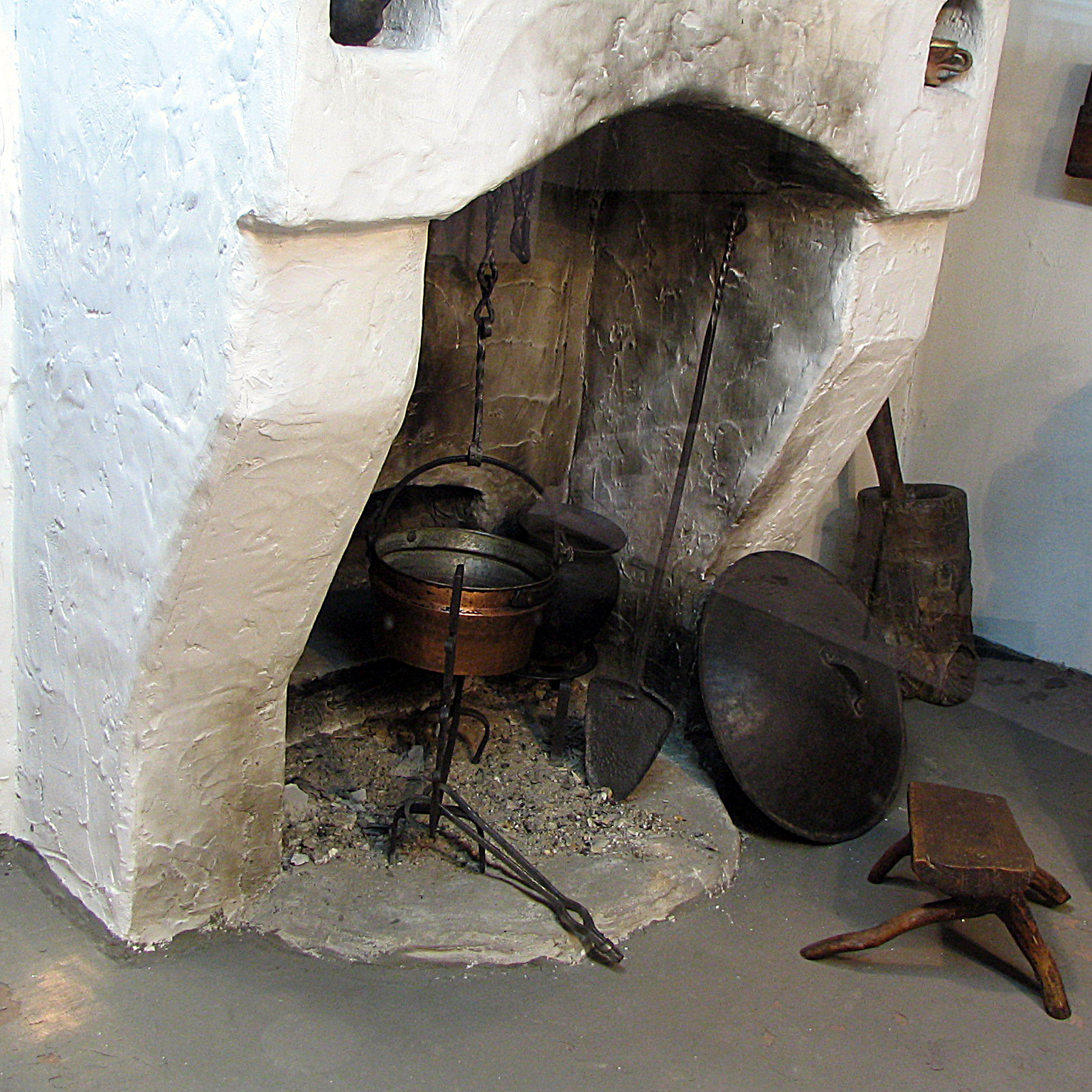
Traditional Serbian Ognjište

Ventless fireplaces (duct free/room-venting fireplaces) are fueled by either gel, liquid propane, bottled gas or natural gas. In the United States, some states and local counties have laws restricting these types of fireplaces. They must be properly sized to the area to be heated. There are also air quality control issues due to the amount of moisture they release into the room air, and an oxygen sensor and a carbon monoxide detector are safety essentials.

Direct vent fireplaces are fueled by either liquid propane or natural gas. They are completely sealed from the area that is heated, and vent all exhaust gasses to the exterior of the structure.

Chimney and flue types:

- Masonry (brick or stone fireplaces and chimneys) with or without tile-lined flue.
- Reinforced concrete chimneys. Fundamental design flaws bankrupted the US manufacturers and made the design obsolete. These chimneys often show vertical cracks on the exterior.
- Metal-lined flue: Double- or triple-walled metal pipe running up inside a new or existing wood-framed or masonry chase.

Newly constructed flues may feature a chase cover, a cap, and a spark arrestor at the top to keep small animals out and to prevent sparks from being broadcast into the atmosphere. All gas fireplaces require trained gas service members to carry out installations.

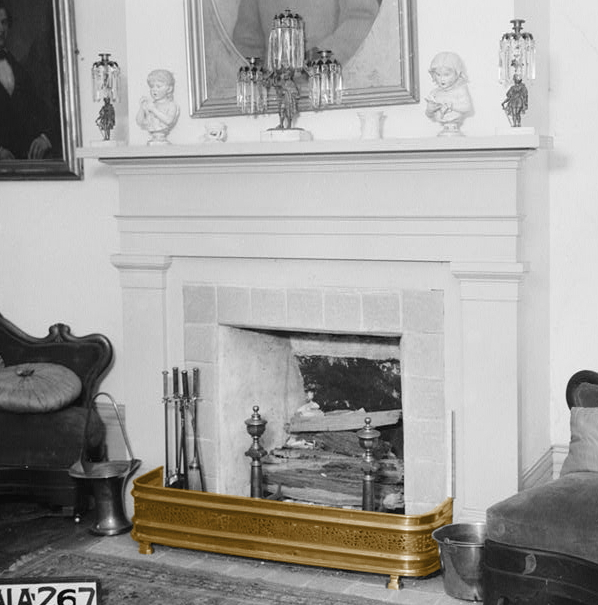
A fender (colorized) is set in front of the fireplace to contain embers, soot and ash.

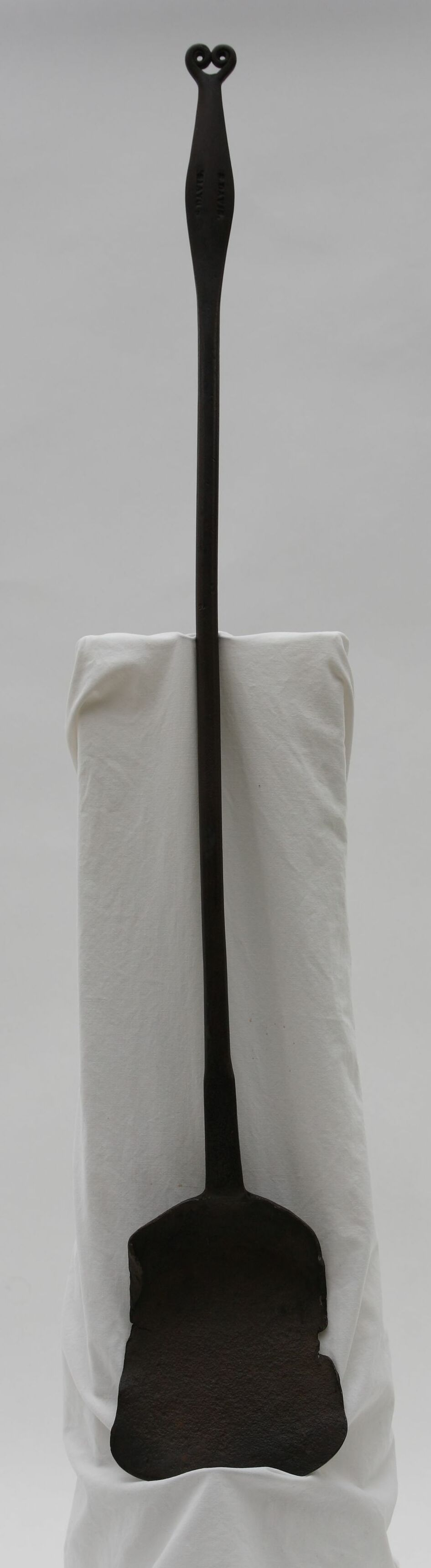
Fireplace shovel

=== Accessories ===
A wide range of accessories are used with fireplaces, which range between countries, regions, and historical periods. For the interior, common in recent Western cultures include grates, fireguards, log boxes, andirons and pellet baskets, all of which cradle fuel and accelerate combustion. A grate (or fire grate) is a frame, usually of iron bars, to retain fuel for a fire. Heavy metal firebacks are sometimes used to capture and re-radiate heat, to protect the back of the fireplace, and as decoration. Concrete backer board is commonly installed to prevent sparks from catching around fireplaces. Fenders are low metal frames set in front of the fireplace to contain embers, soot and ash. For fireplace tending, tools include pokers, bellows, tongs, shovels, brushes and tool stands. Other wider accessories can include log baskets, companion sets, coal buckets, cabinet accessories and more.

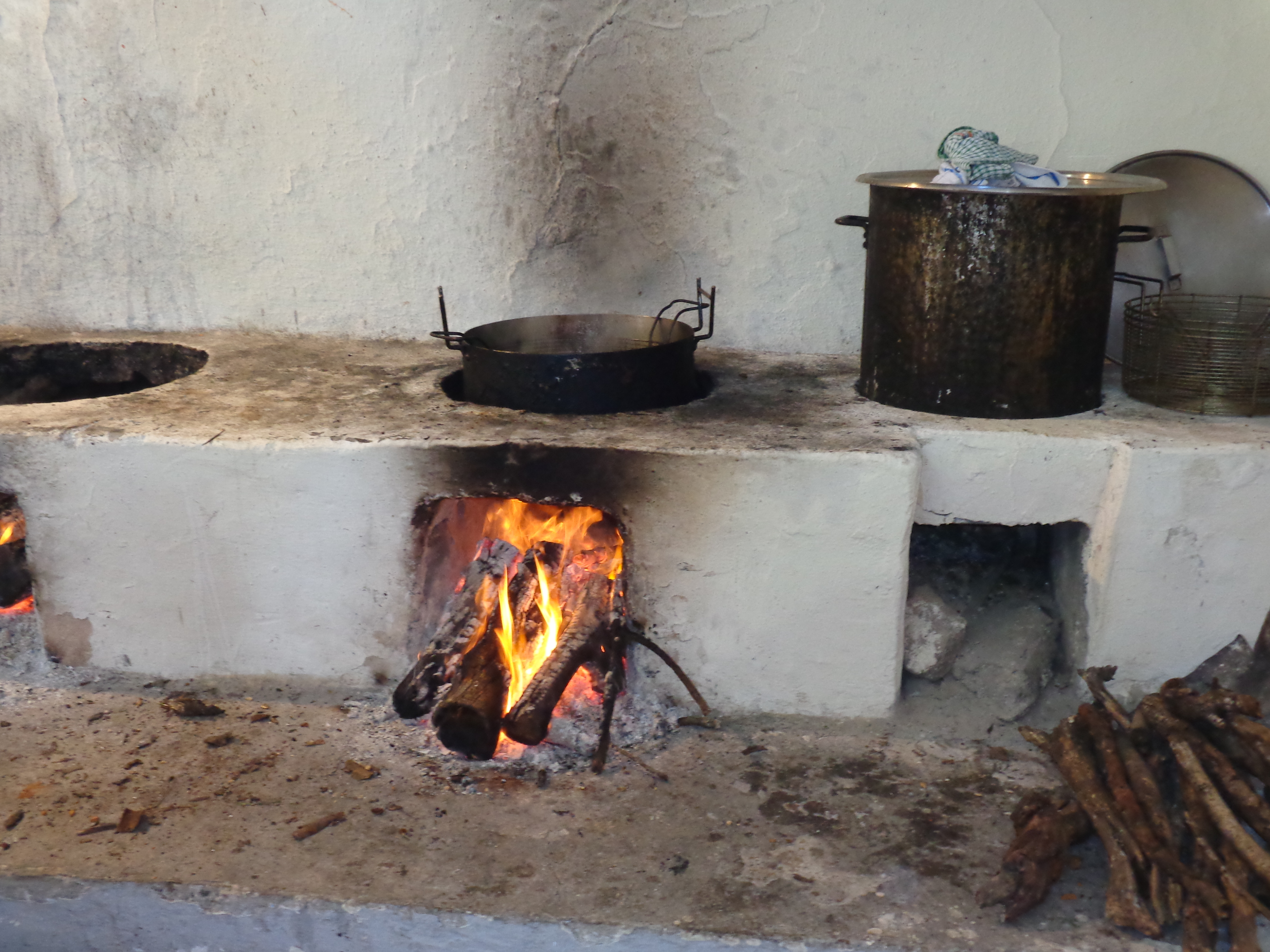
Cooking over a fireplace

== History ==
Ancient fire pits were sometimes built in the ground, within caves, or in the center of a hut or dwelling. Evidence of prehistoric, man-made fires exists on all six inhabited continents. The disadvantage of early indoor fire pits was that they produced toxic and/or irritating smoke inside the dwelling.

Fire pits developed into raised hearths in buildings, but venting smoke depended on open windows or holes in roofs. The medieval great hall typically had a centrally located hearth, where an open fire burned with the smoke rising to the vent in the roof. Louvers were developed during the Middle Ages to allow the roof vents to be covered so rain and snow would not enter.

Also during the Middle Ages, smoke canopies were invented to prevent smoke from spreading through a room and vent it out through a wall or roof. These could be placed against stone walls, instead of taking up the middle of the room, and this allowed smaller rooms to be heated.

Chimneys were invented in northern Europe in the 11th or 12th century and largely fixed the problem of smoke, more reliably venting it outside. They made it possible to give the fireplace a draft, and also made it possible to put fireplaces in multiple rooms in buildings conveniently. They did not come into general use immediately, however, as they were expensive to build and maintain.

In 1678, Prince Rupert, nephew of Charles I, raised the grate of the fireplace, improving the airflow and venting system. The 18th century saw two important developments in the history of fireplaces. Benjamin Franklin developed a convection chamber for the fireplace that greatly improved the efficiency of fireplaces and wood-burning stoves. He also improved the airflow by pulling air from a basement and venting out a longer area at the top. In the later 18th century, Count Rumford designed a fireplace with a tall, shallow firebox that was better at drawing the smoke up and out of the building. The shallow design also improved greatly the amount of heat transfer projected into the room.

The Aesthetic movement of the 1870s and 1880s favoured a more traditional look based on stone, with simple designs and limited ornamentation. In the 1890s, the Aesthetic movement gave way to the Arts and Crafts movement, which still emphasized quality stone and practical features. Stone fireplaces at this time were a symbol of prosperity, as to some degree they remain today.

=== Evolution of fireplace design ===
Over time, the purpose of fireplaces has changed from one of necessity to one of visual interest. Early ones were more fire pits than modern fireplaces. They were used for warmth on cold days and nights, as well as for cooking. They also served as a gathering place within the home. These fire pits were usually centered within a room, allowing more people to gather around it.

Many flaws were found in early fireplace designs. Along with the Industrial Revolution, came large-scale housing developments, necessitating a standardization of fireplaces. The most renowned fireplace designers of this time were the Adam Brothers: John Adam, Robert Adam, and James Adam. They perfected a style of fireplace design that was used for generations. It was smaller, more brightly lit, with an emphasis on the quality of the materials used in their construction, instead of their size.

By the 1800s, most new fireplaces were made up of two parts, the surround and the insert. The surround consisted of the mantelpiece and side supports, usually in wood, marble or granite. The insert was where the fire burned, and was constructed of cast iron often backed with decorative tiles. As well as providing heat, the fireplaces of the Victorian era were thought to add a cosy ambiance to homes. In the US state of Wisconsin, some elementary classrooms would contain decorated fireplaces to ease children's transition from home to school.

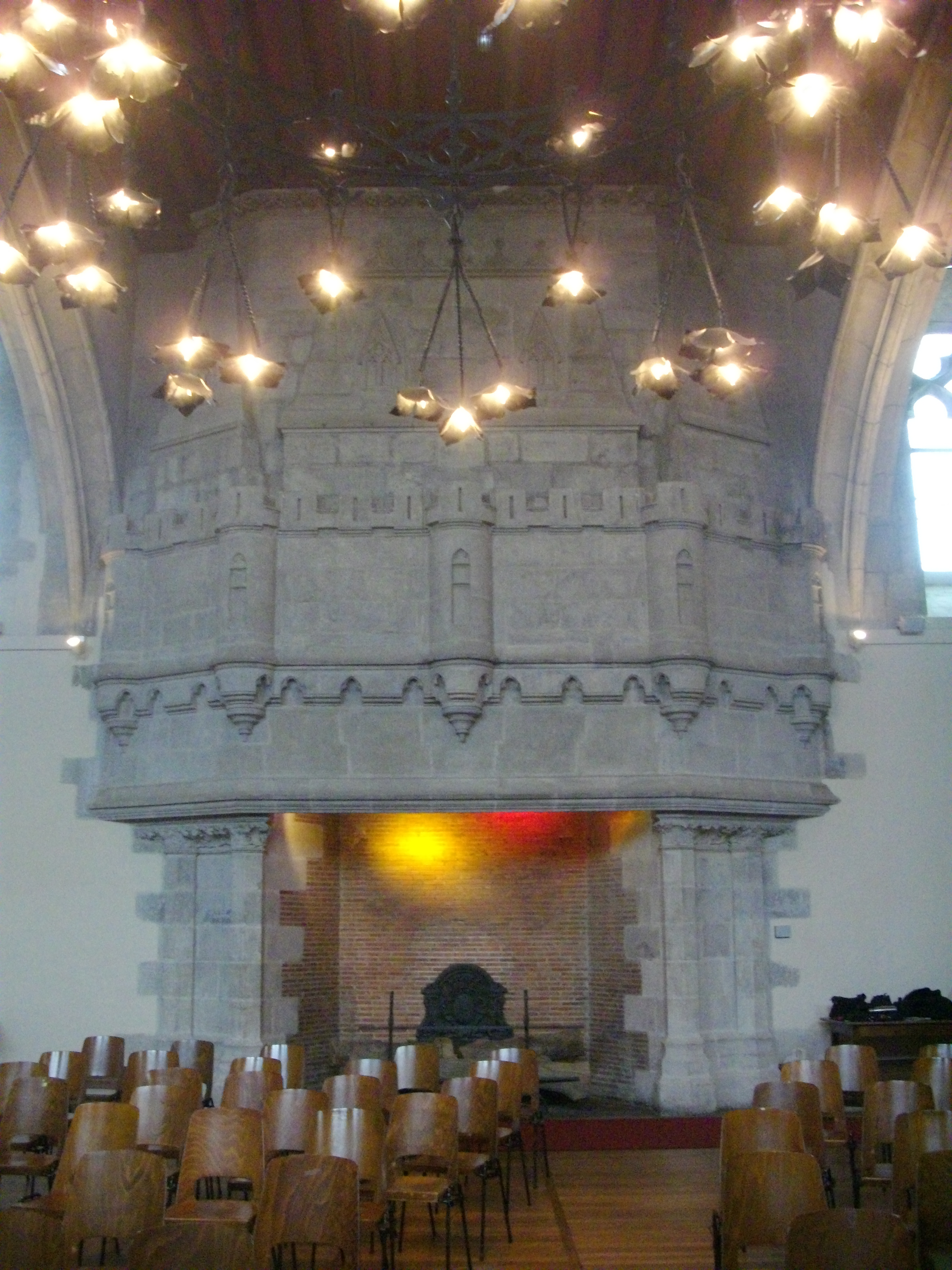
Gothic fireplace in the Hôtel de préfecture du Cher, Bourges, France, by Guy de Dammartin or Drouet de Dammartin, 15th century

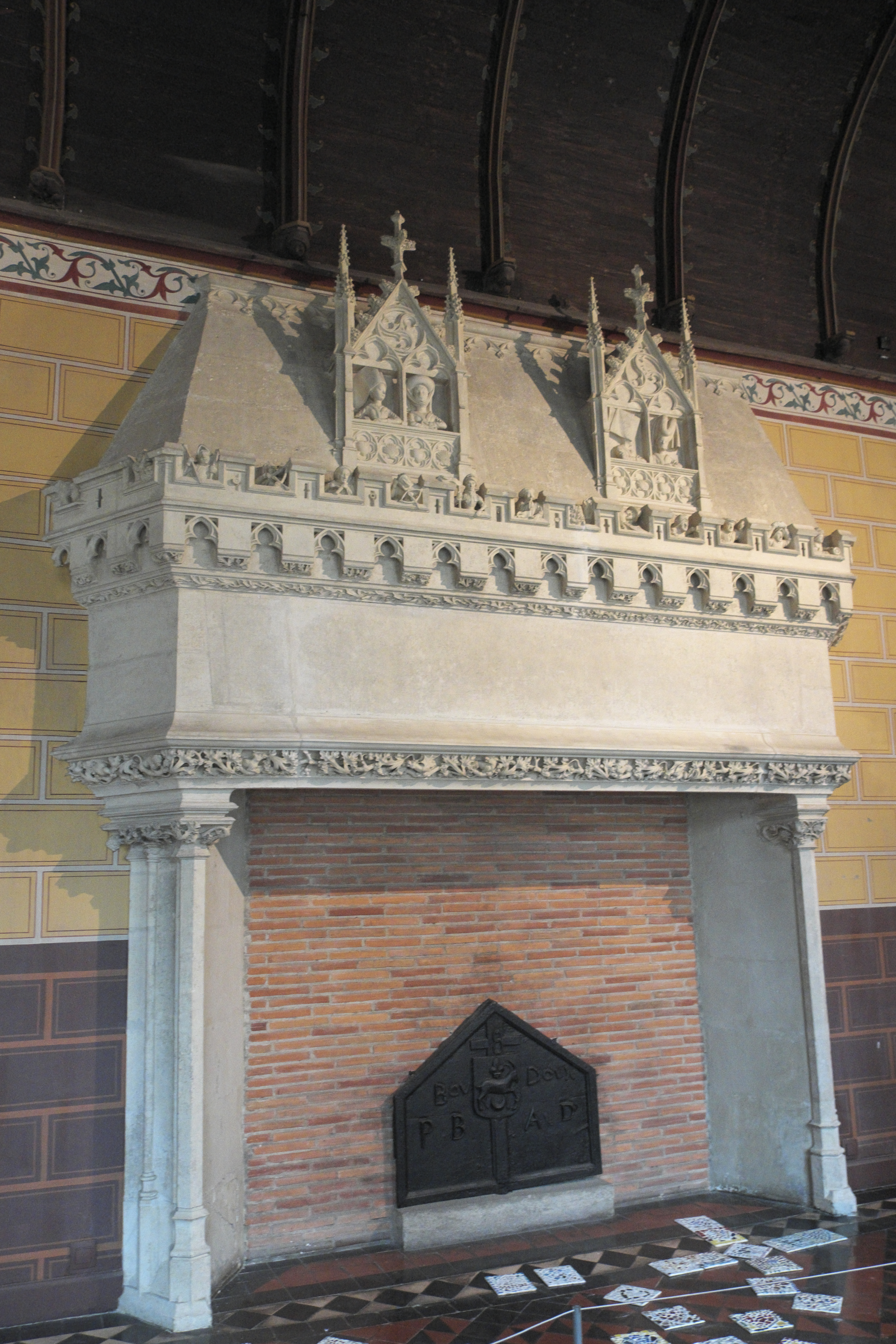
Gothic fireplace in the Palais Jacques Coeur, Bourges, France, unknown architect or sculptor, 15th century

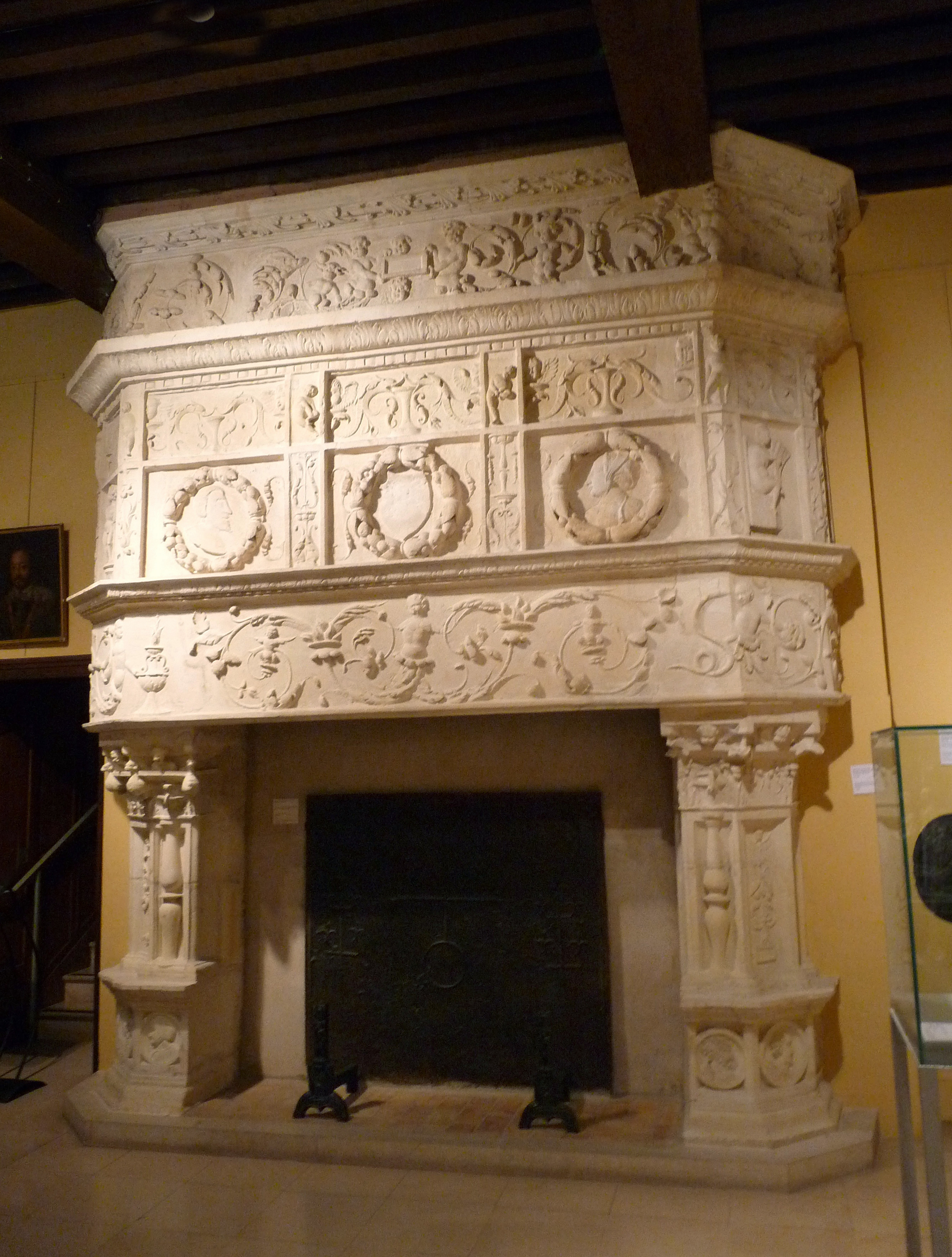
Renaissance fireplace, unknown architect or sculptor, 16th century, limestone, Château des ducs de Bar, Bar-le-Duc, France

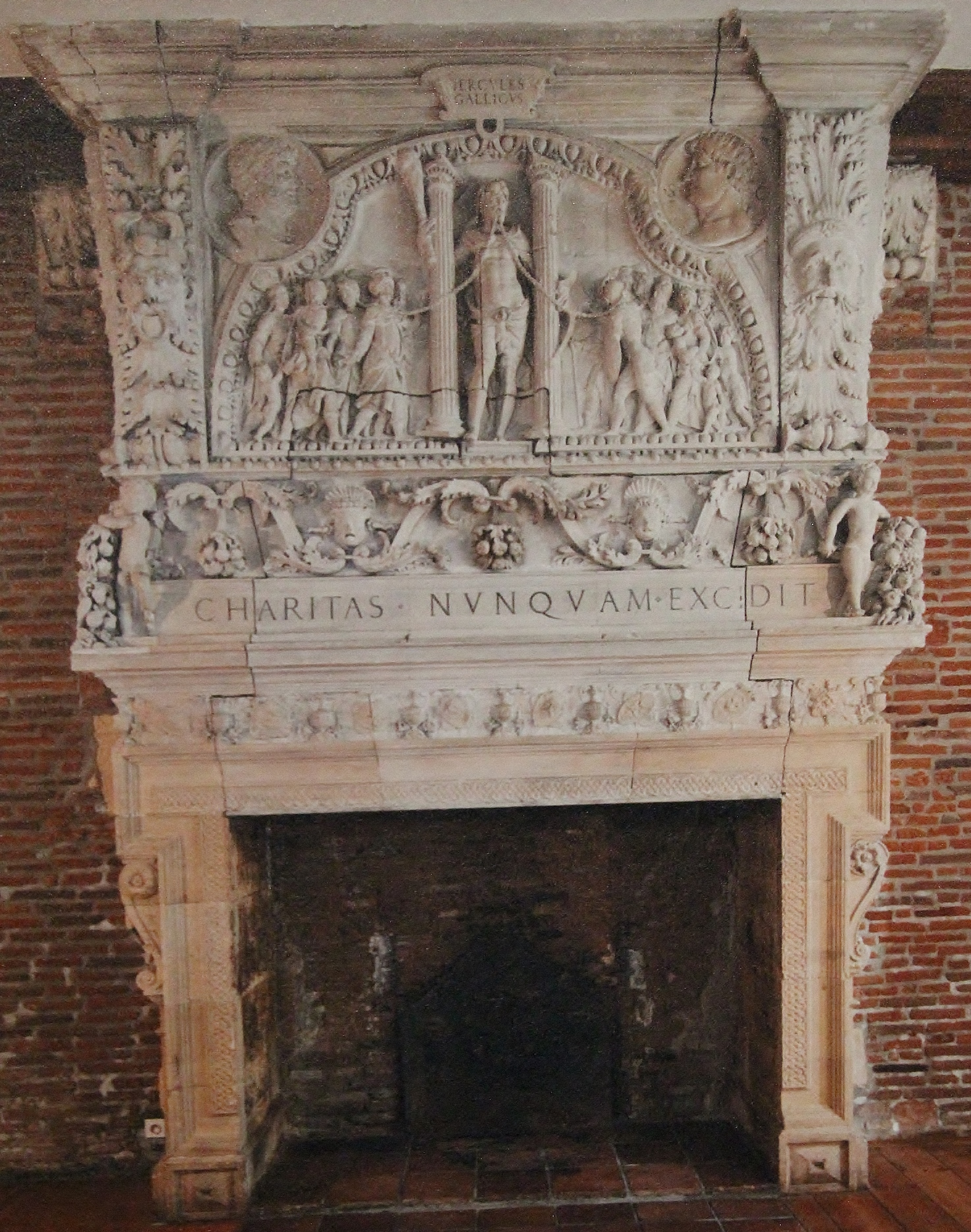
Renaissance fireplace in the Hôtel Tornié-Barassy (Rue de la Madeleine no. 3), Toulouse, France, unknown architect or sculptor, 16th century

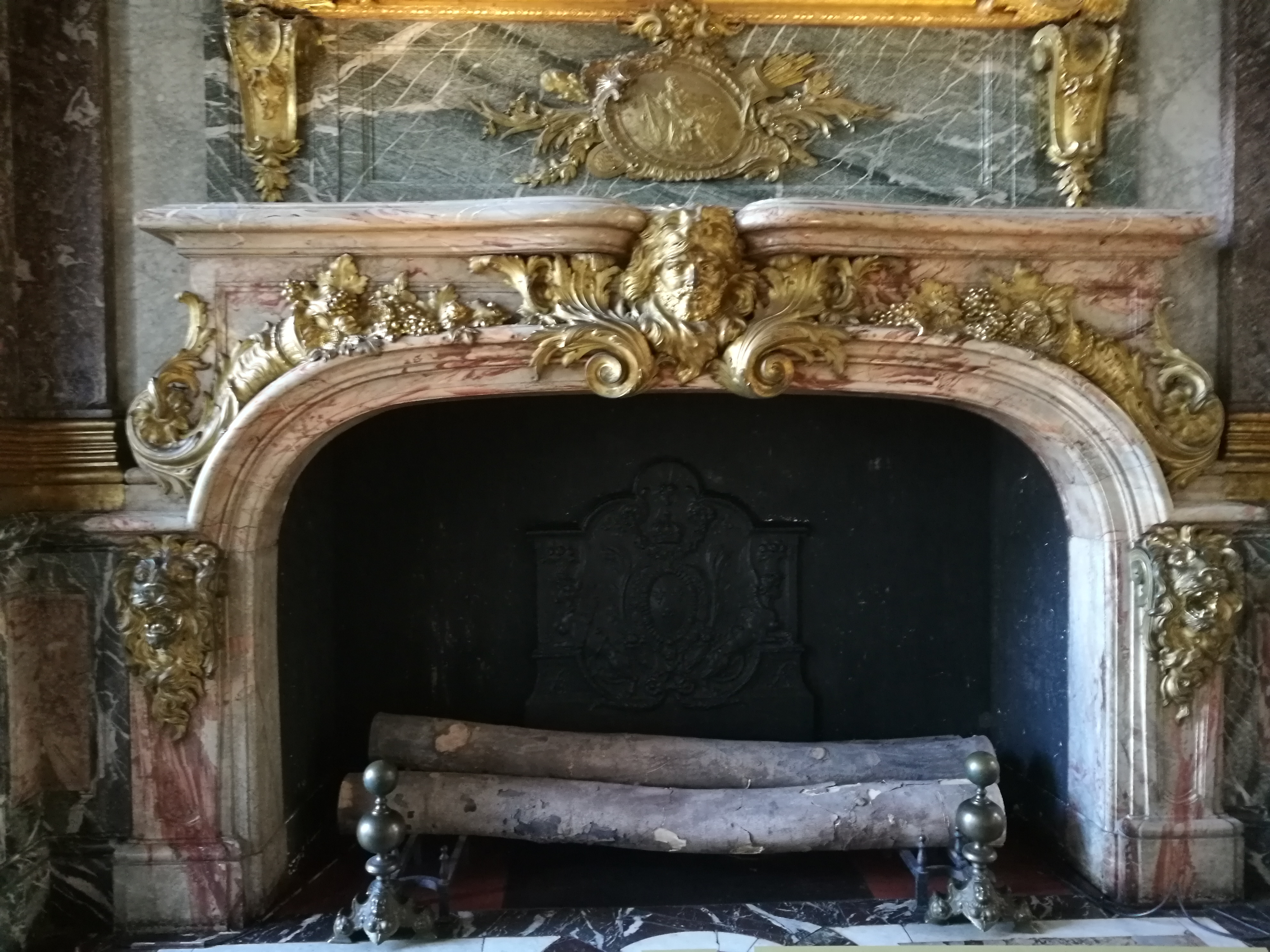
Baroque fireplace in the Salon d'Hercule, Palace of Versailles, Versailles, France, probably by Robert de Cotte, c.1710

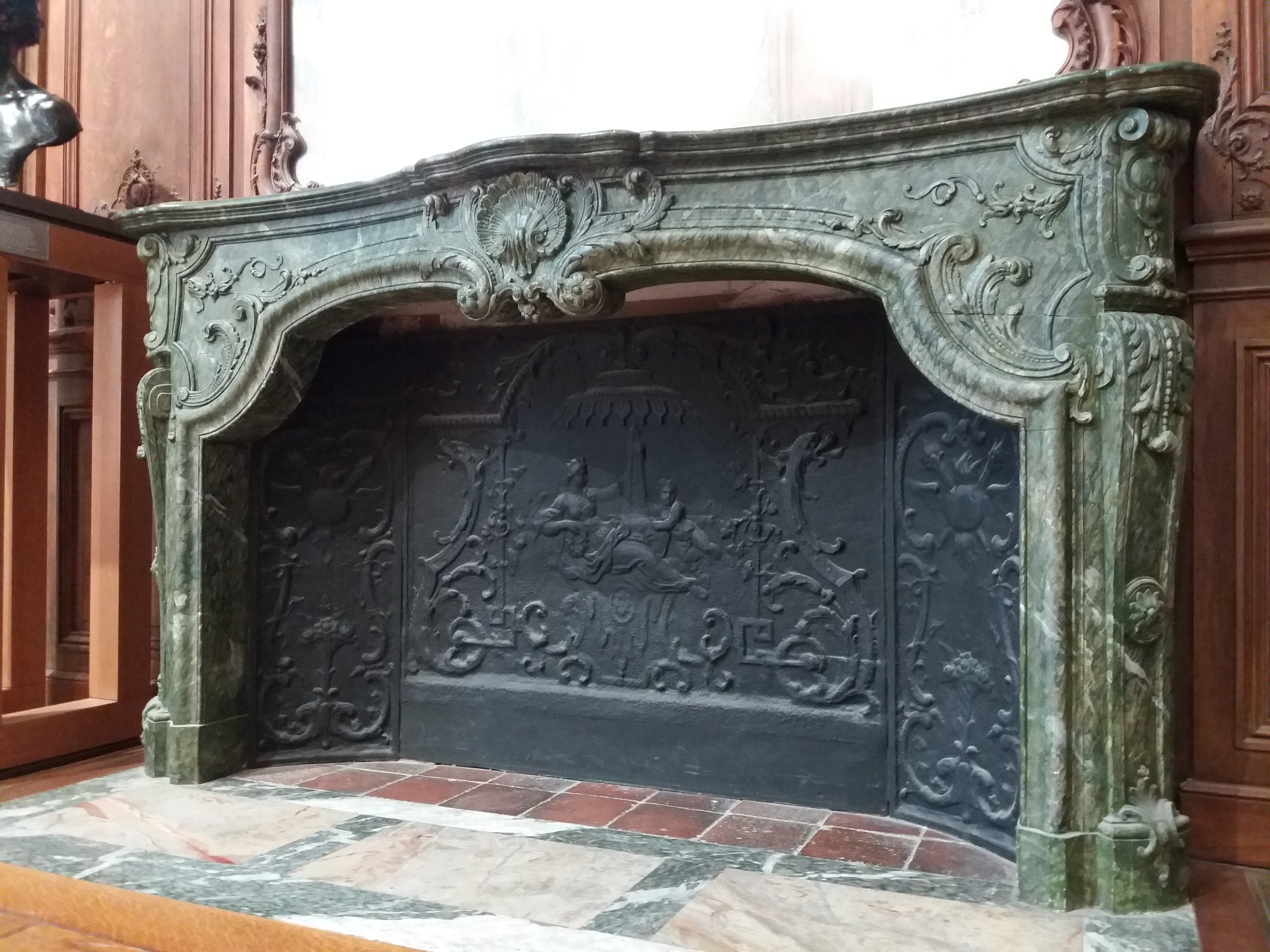
Rococo fireplace in the Hôtel Biron (Rue de Varenne no. 77), Paris, by Jean Aubert, 1727–1732

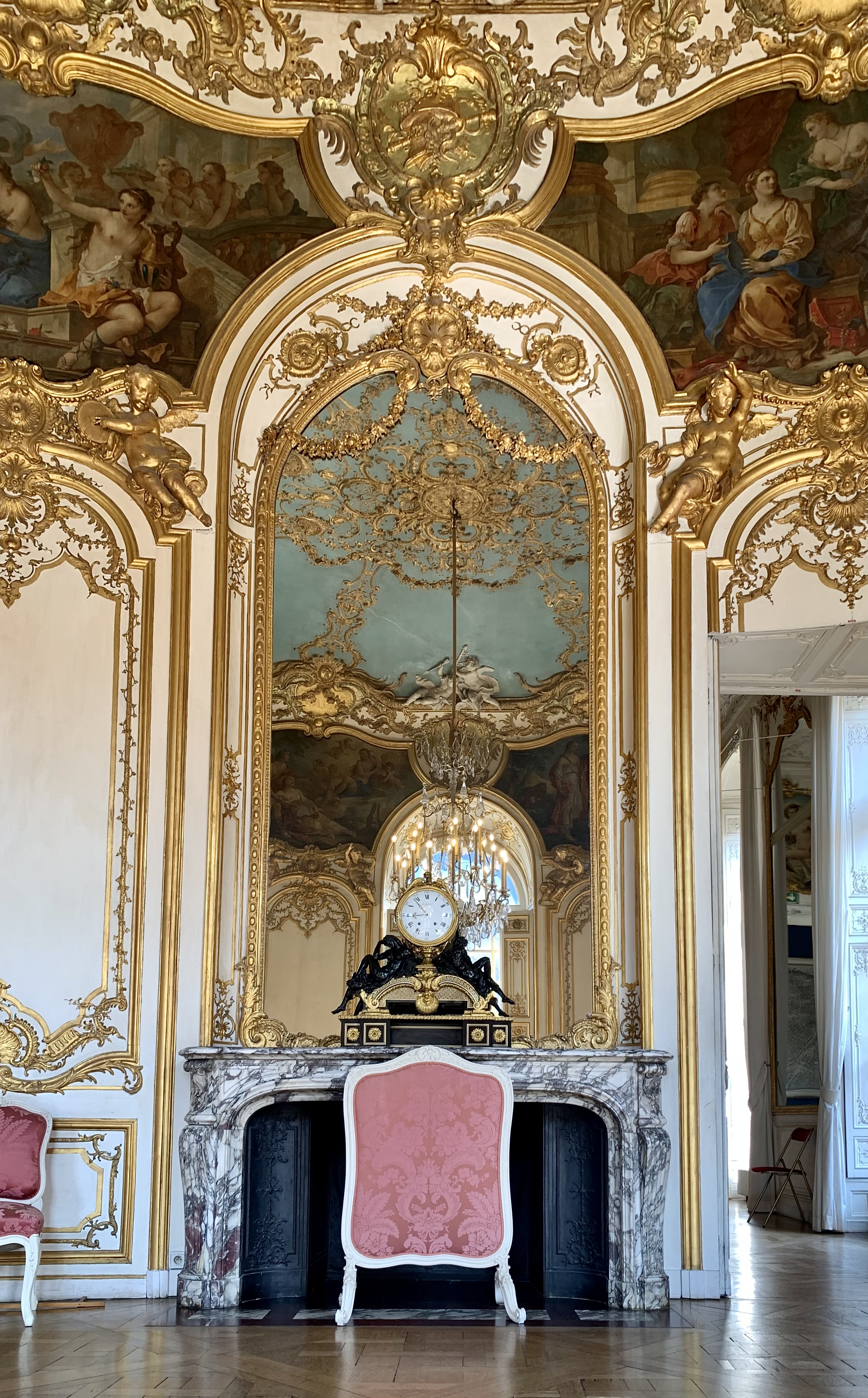
Rococo fireplace in the Oval Salon of the Princesse in the Hôtel de Soubise (Rue des Francs-Bourgeois no. 60), Paris, by Germain Boffrand, 1740

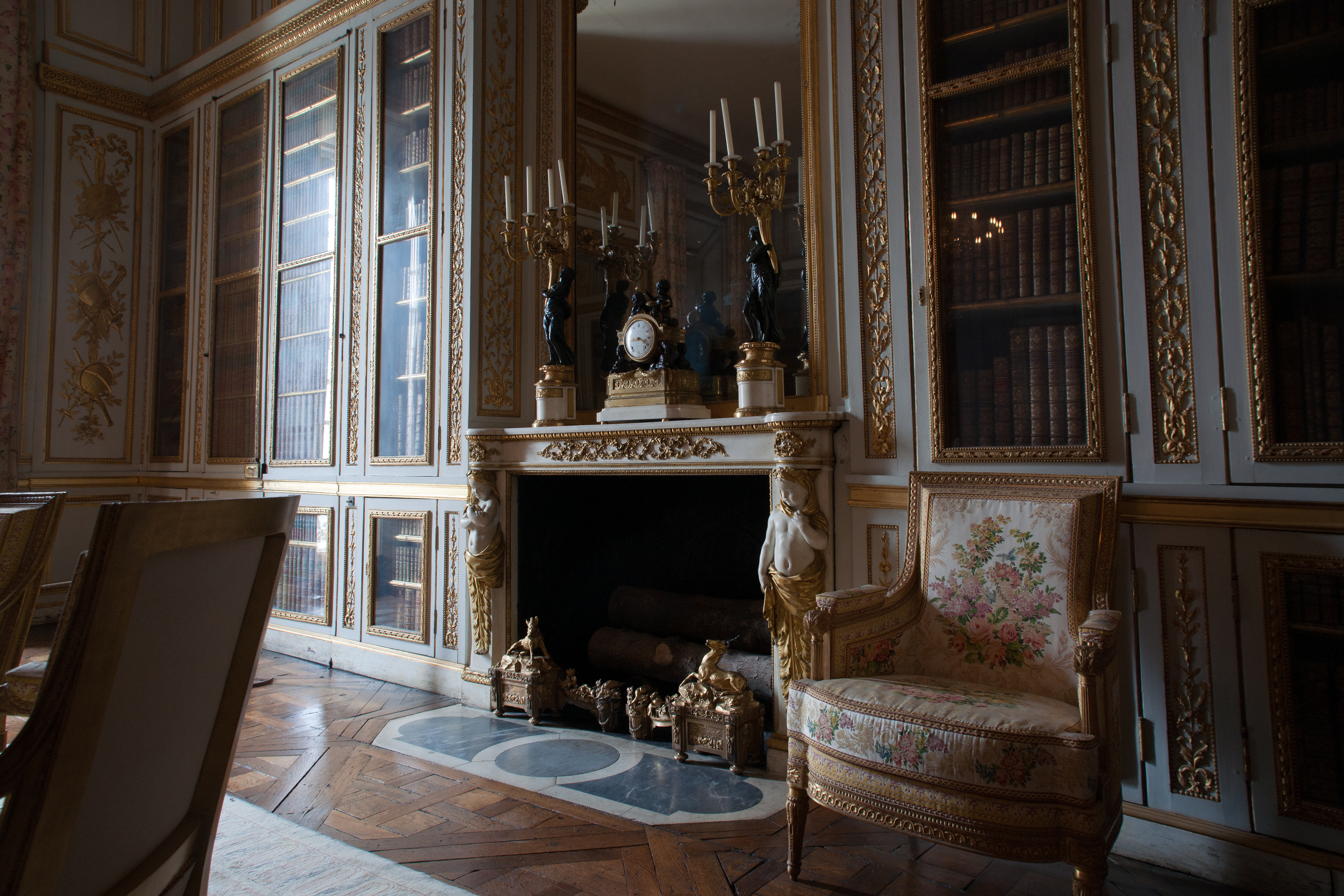
Neoclassical fireplace in the Bibliothèque de Louis XVI, Palace of Versailles, designed by Ange-Jacques Gabriel and decorated with bronzes made by Pierre Gouthière, 1774

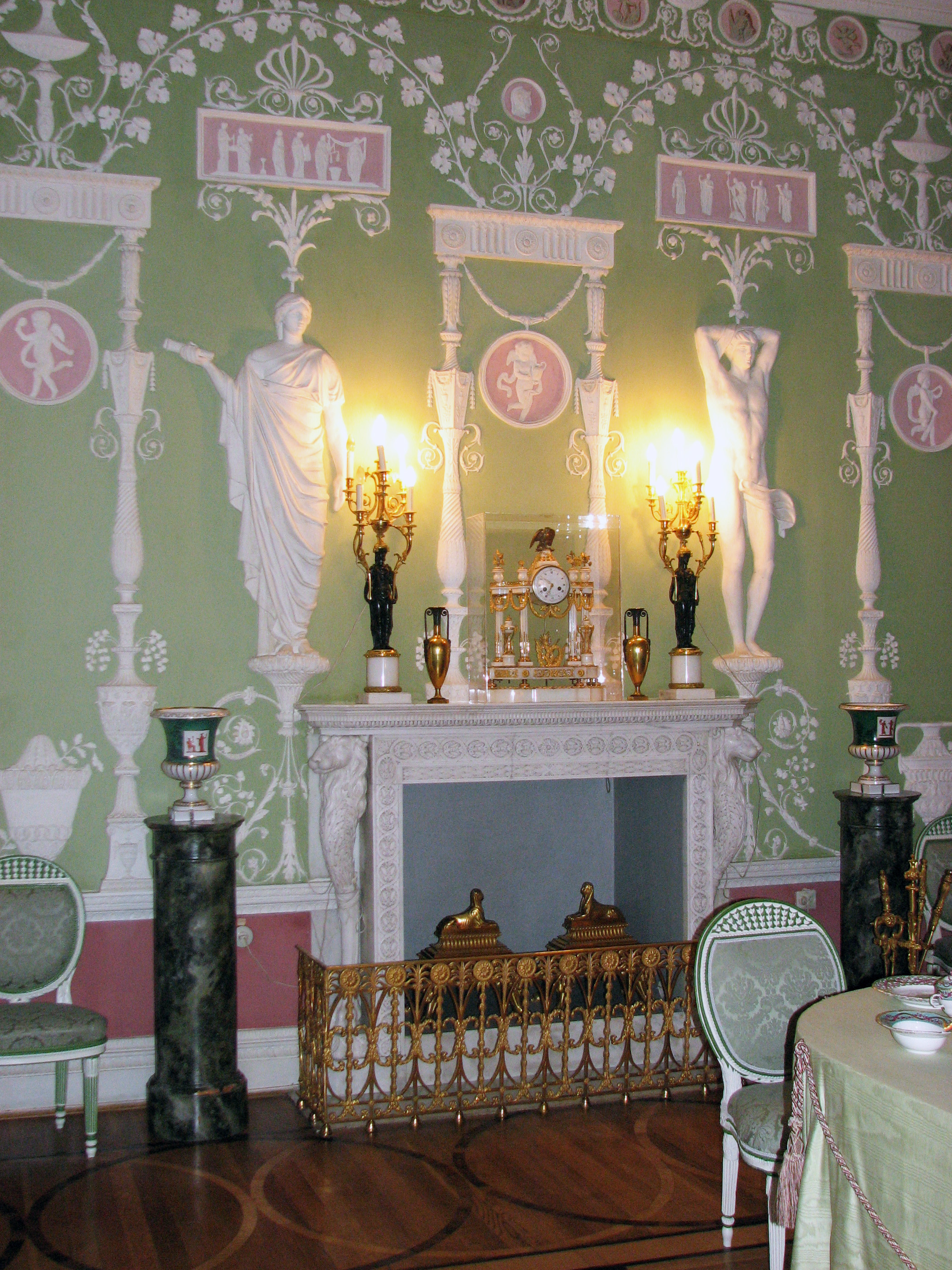
Neoclassical marble fireplace in the green dining room of Catherine Palace, Tsarskoye Selo, Russia, by Charles Cameron, 1779

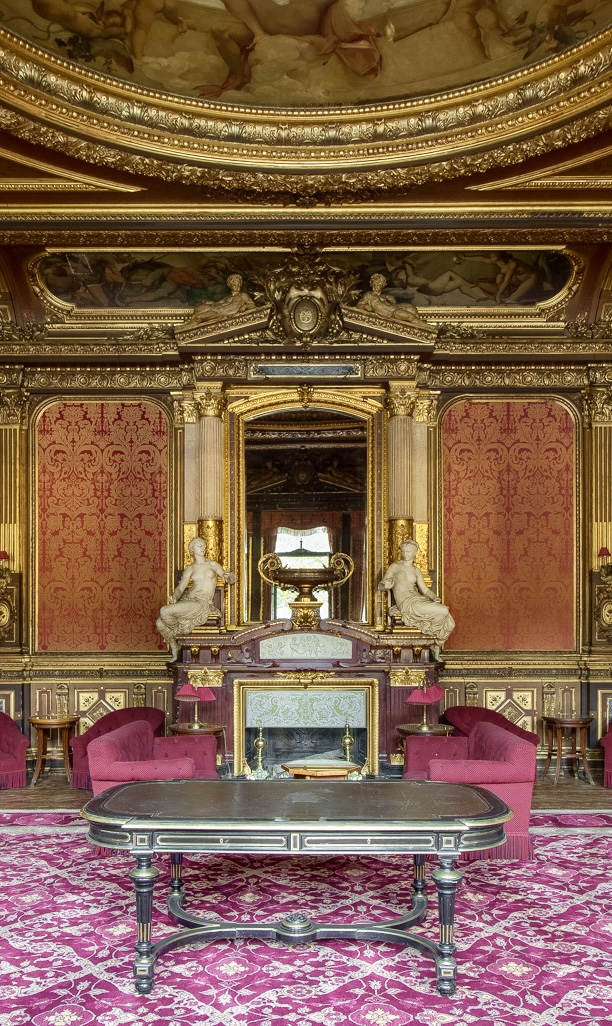
Beaux-Arts fireplace in the Hôtel de la Païva (Avenue des Champs-Élysées no. 25), Paris, designed by Pierre Manguin and sculpted by Eugène Delaplanche, 1856–1866

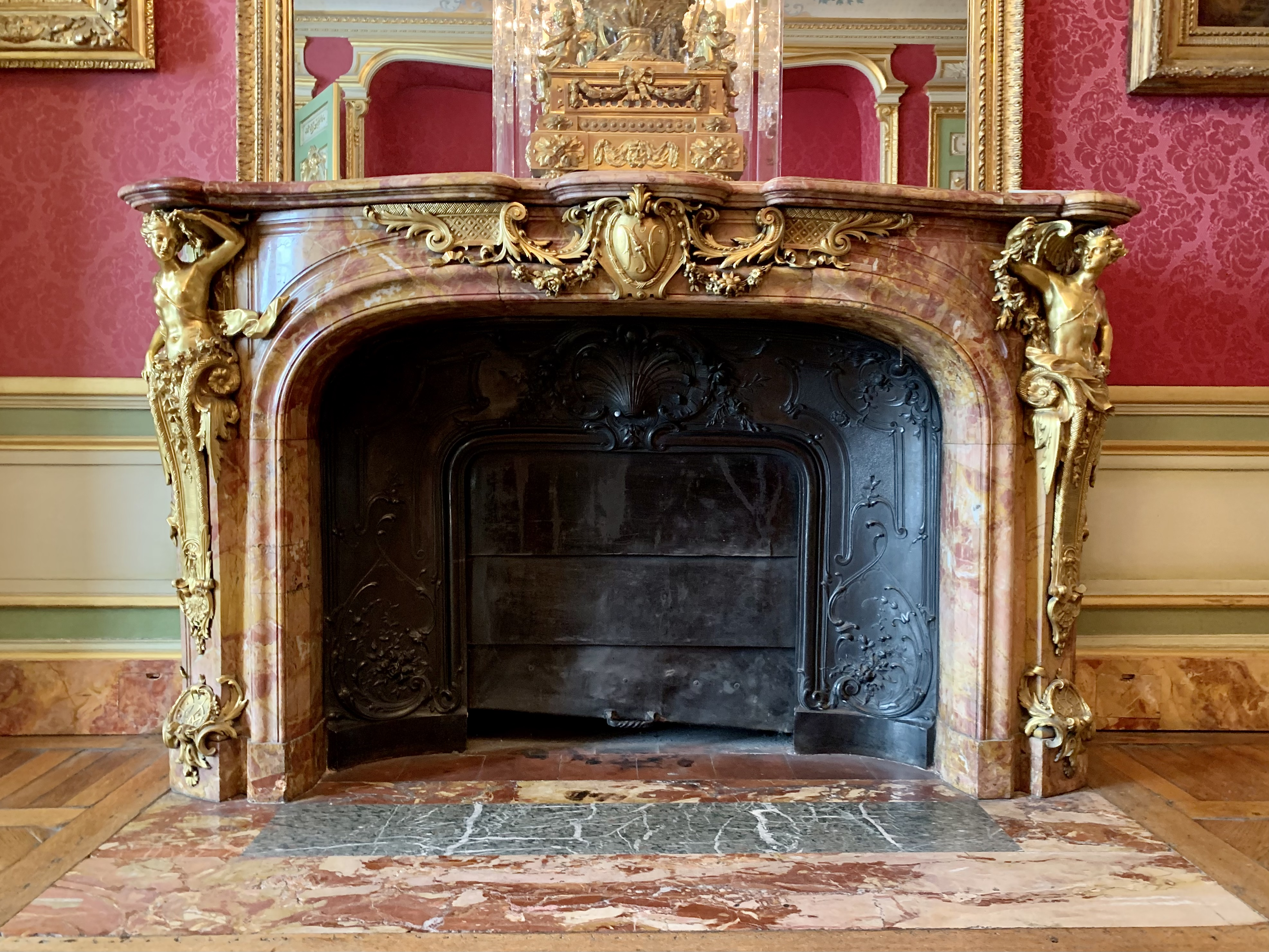
Rococo Revival fireplace in the room 538 of the Louvre Palace, Paris, unknown architect or sculptor, 19th century

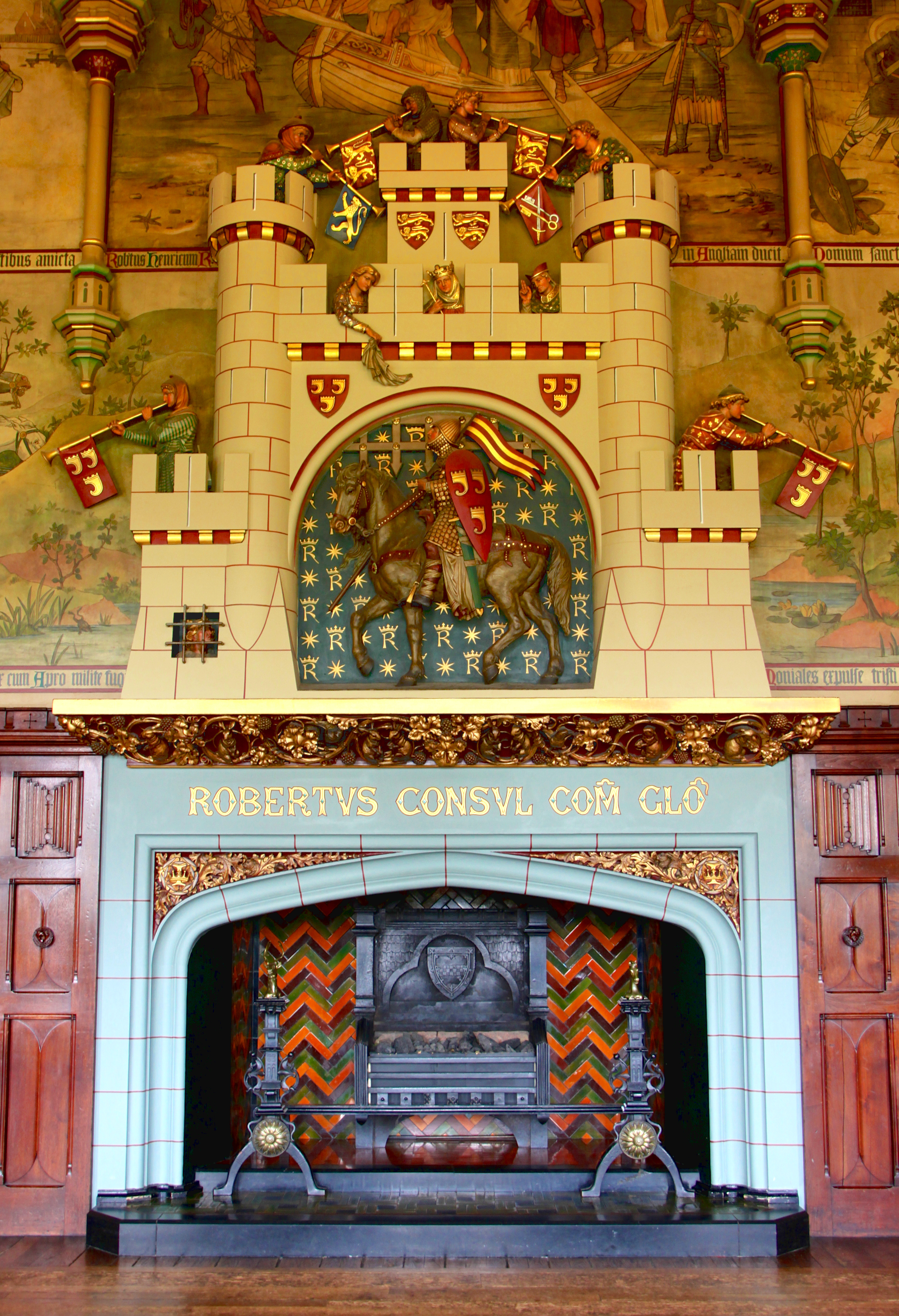
Gothic Revival fireplace in the banqueting hall of the Cardiff Castle, Cardiff, UK, by William Burges, 1873

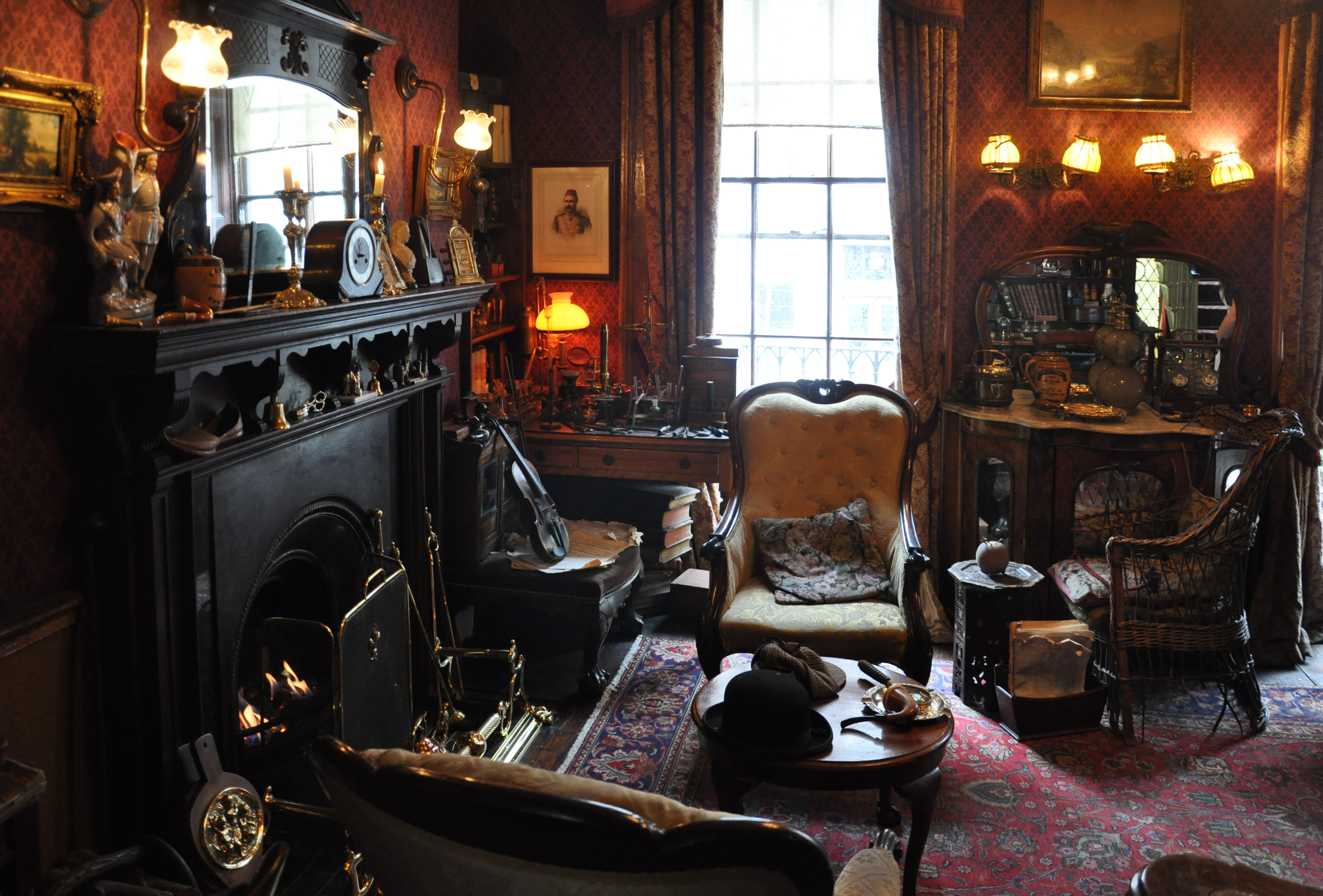
Victorian style "sitting room" with a fireplace in the Sherlock Holmes Museum, London

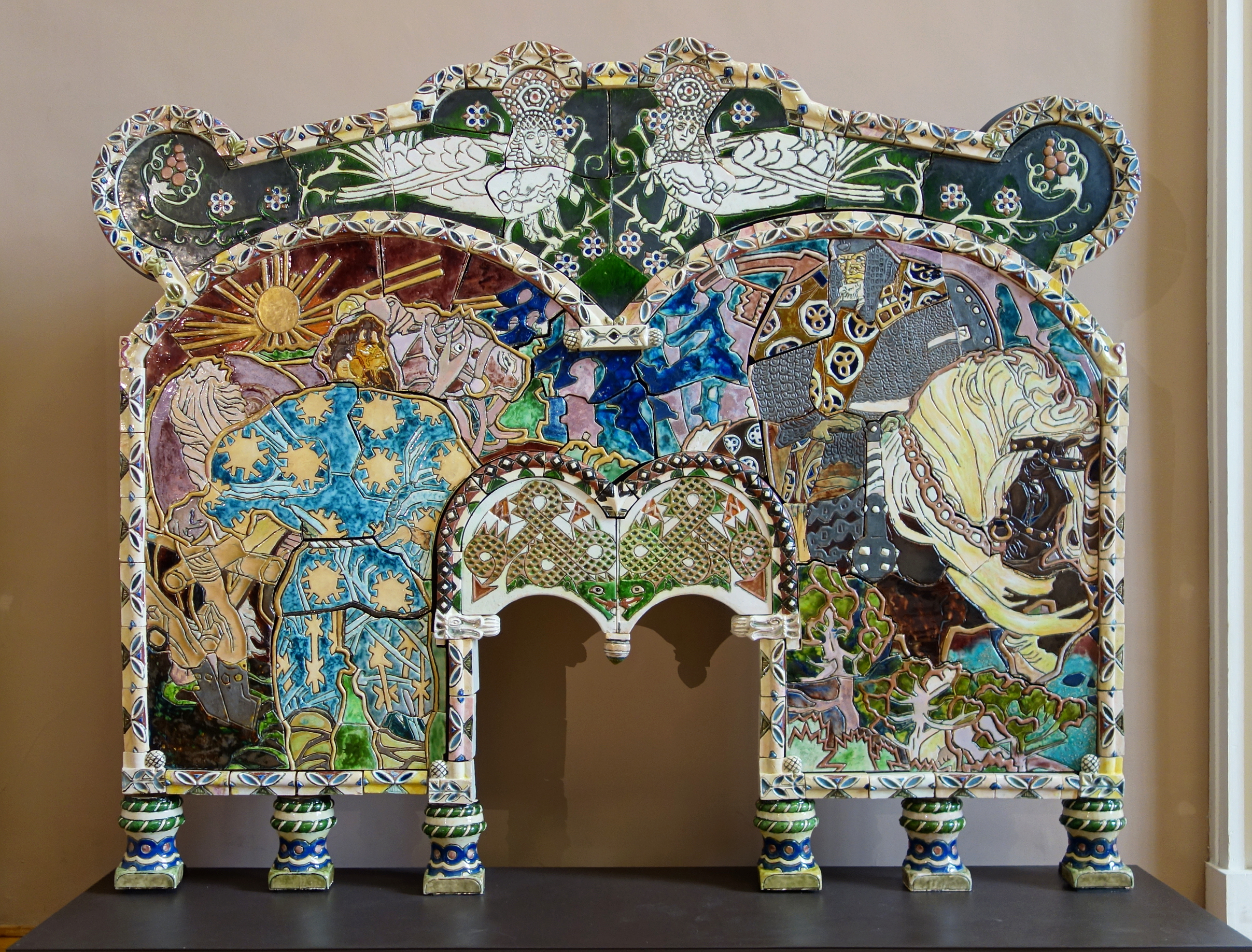
Russian Revival fireplace, by Mikhail Vrubel, 1899–1900, majolica, Palais des Beaux-Arts de Lille, Lille, France

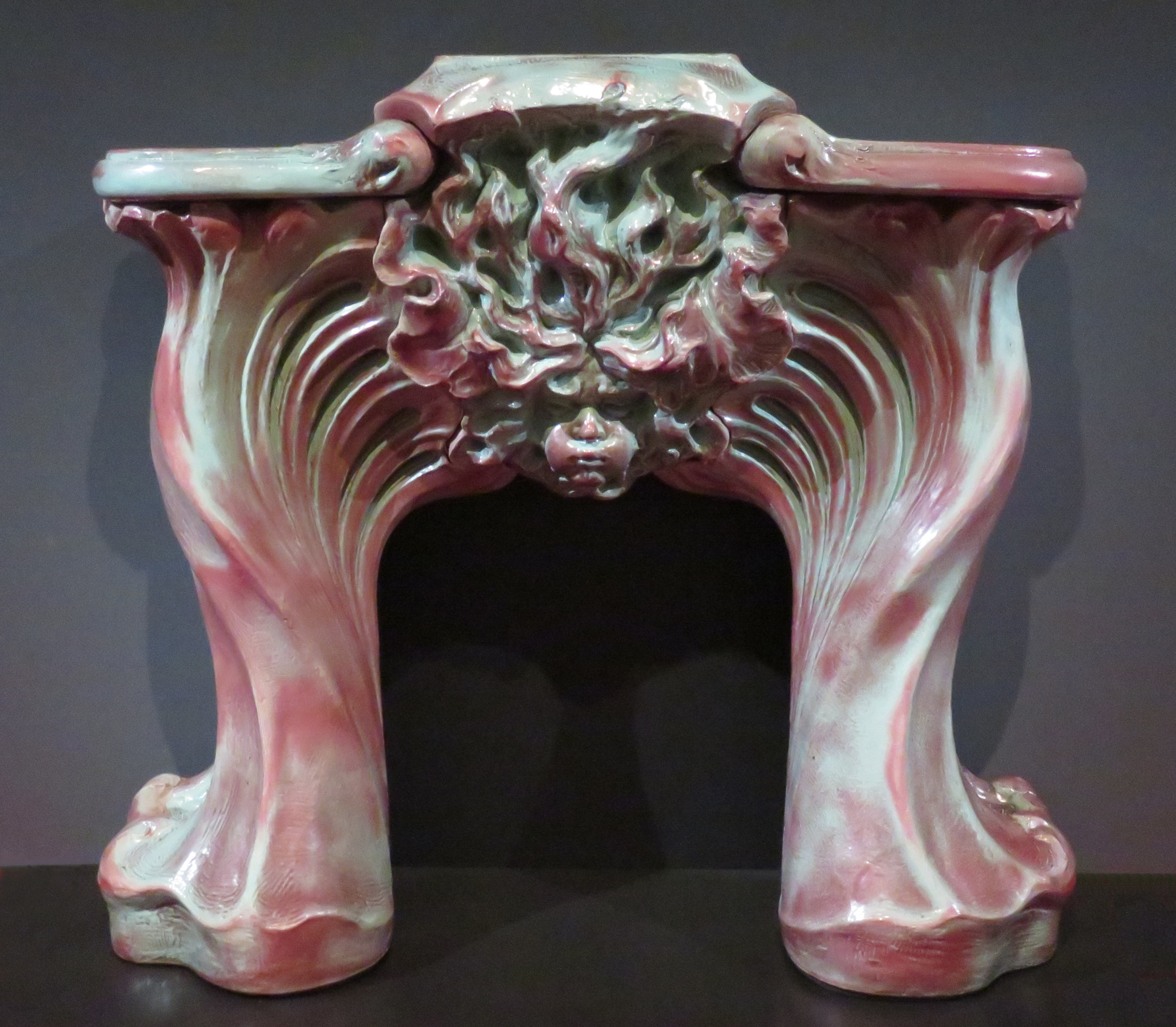
Art Nouveau fireplace, by Émile Muller & Cie, c.1900, stoneware and enamel, Musée départemental de l'Oise, Beauvais, France

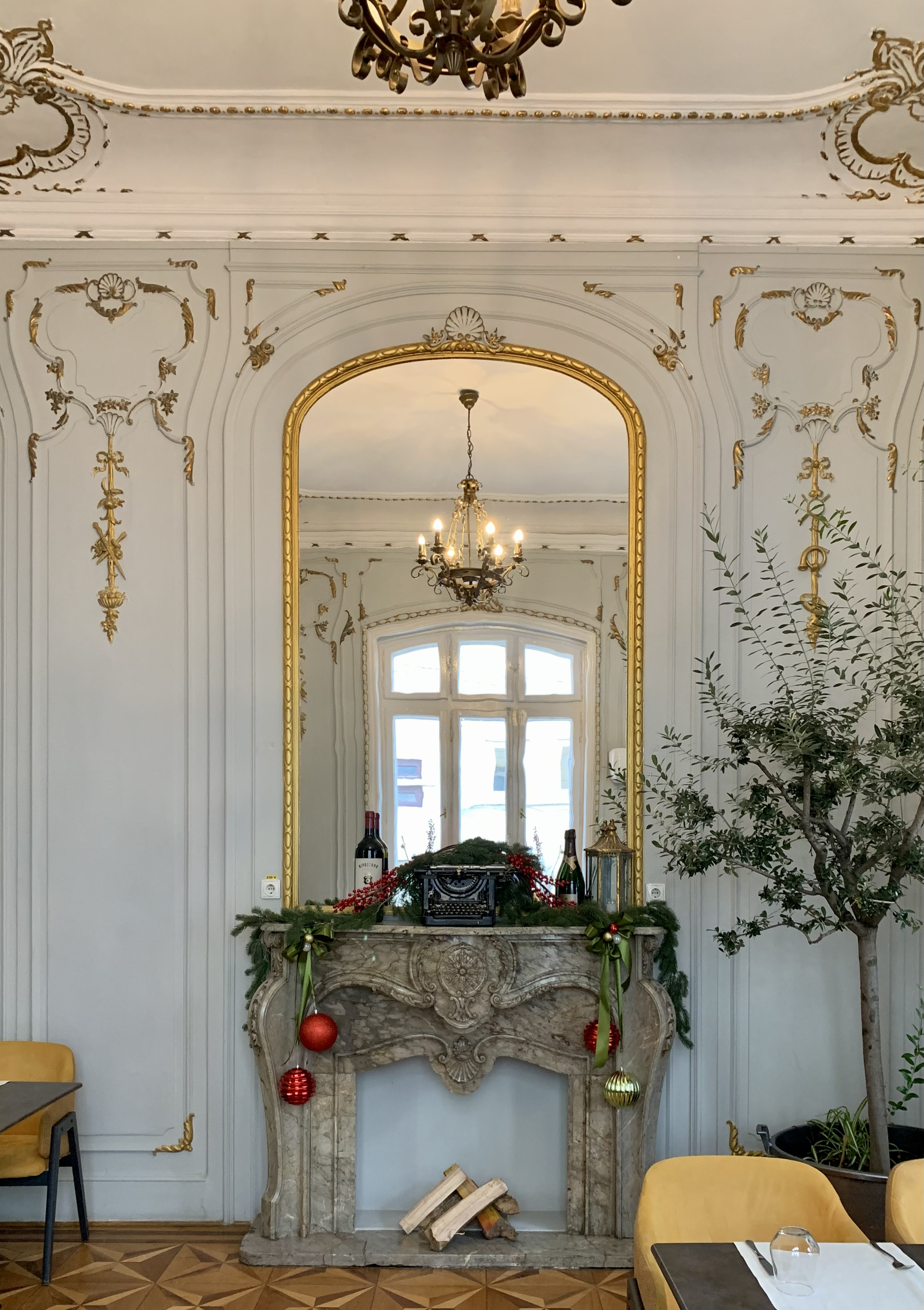
Rococo Revival fireplace in Strada Bocșa no. 4, Bucharest, Romania, unknown architect, c.1900

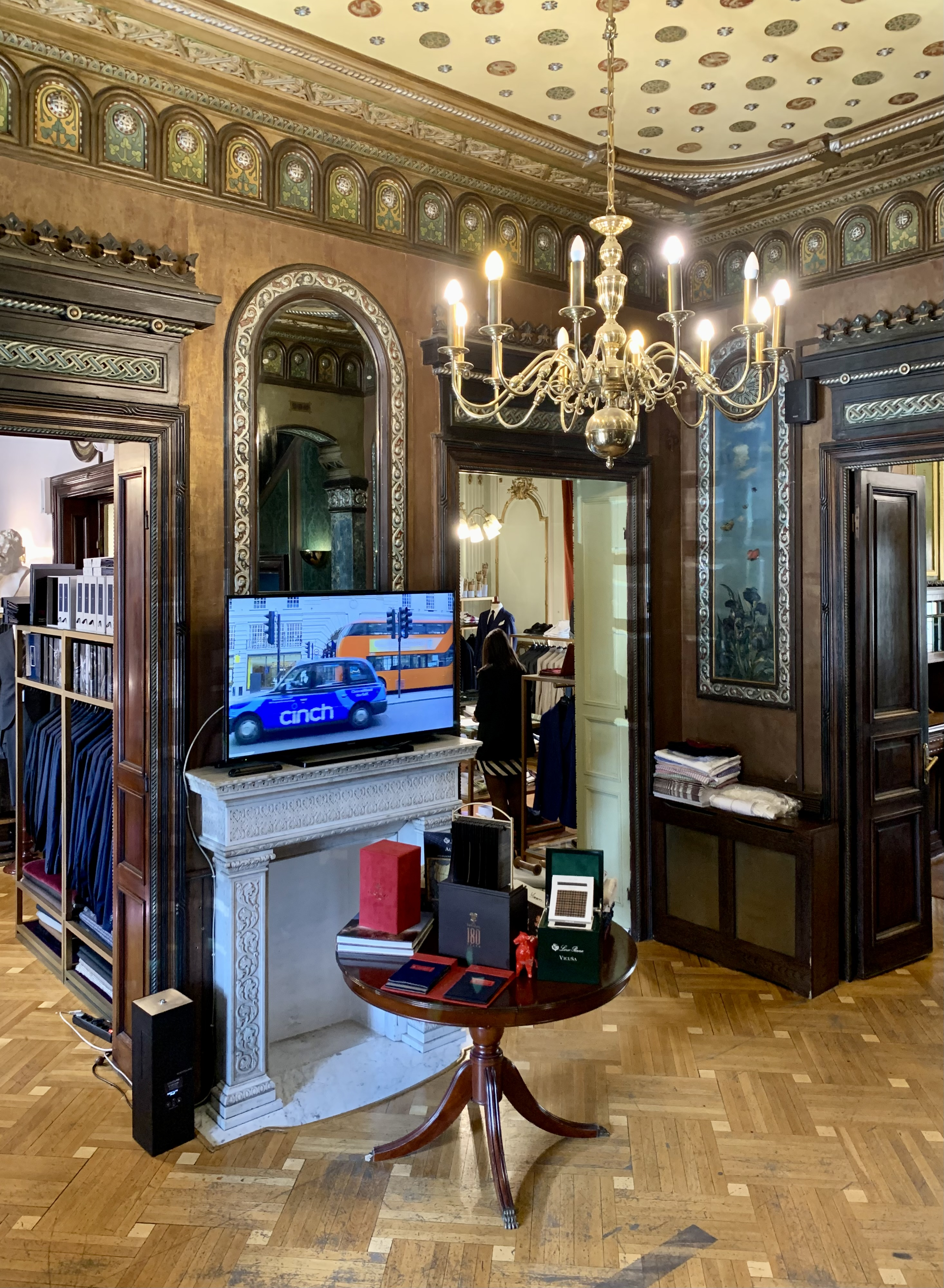
Romanian Revival fireplace in the Gheorghe Petrașcu House (Piața Romană no. 5), Bucharest, by Spiru Cegăneanu, 1912

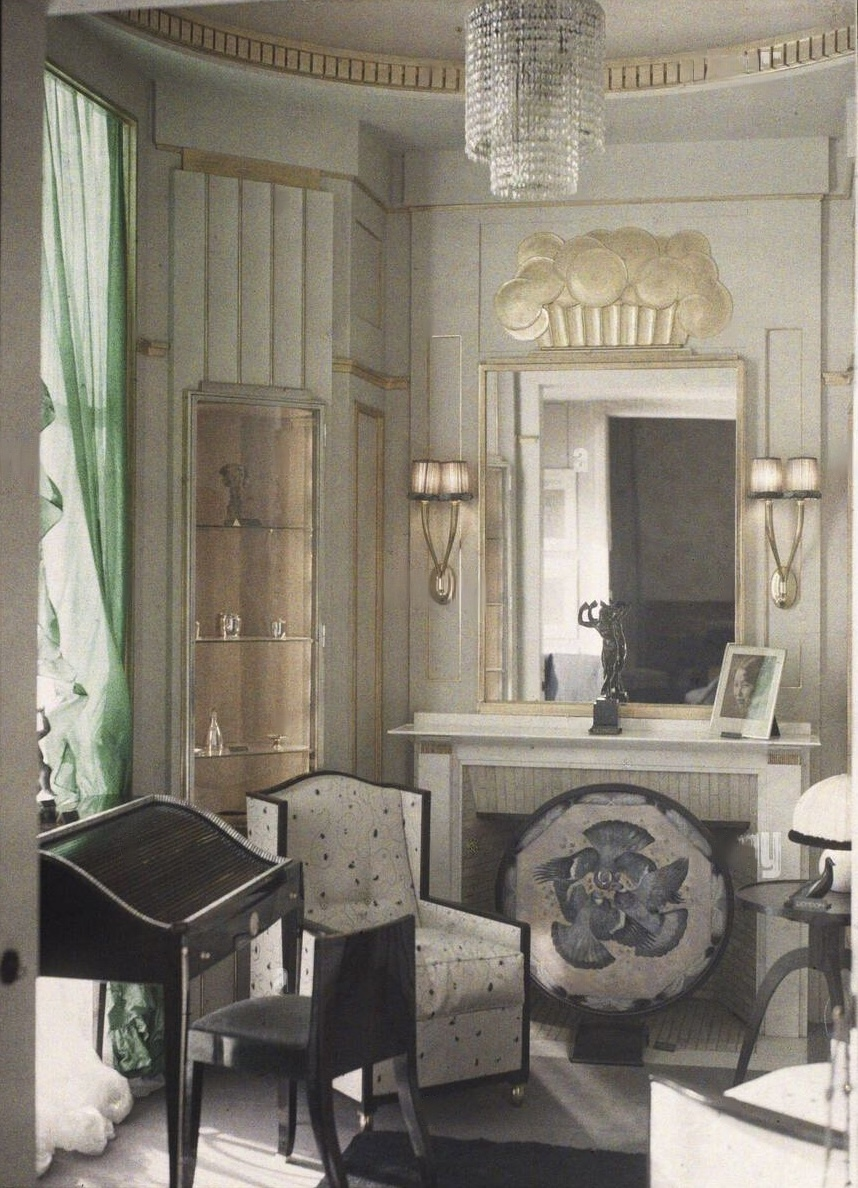
Art Deco fireplace in the boudoir from the Hôtel du Collectionneur at the 1925 Paris Exhibition, by Émile-Jacques Ruhlmann

Video of an antique fireplace in a historical building in Akita, Japan

== Heating efficiency ==
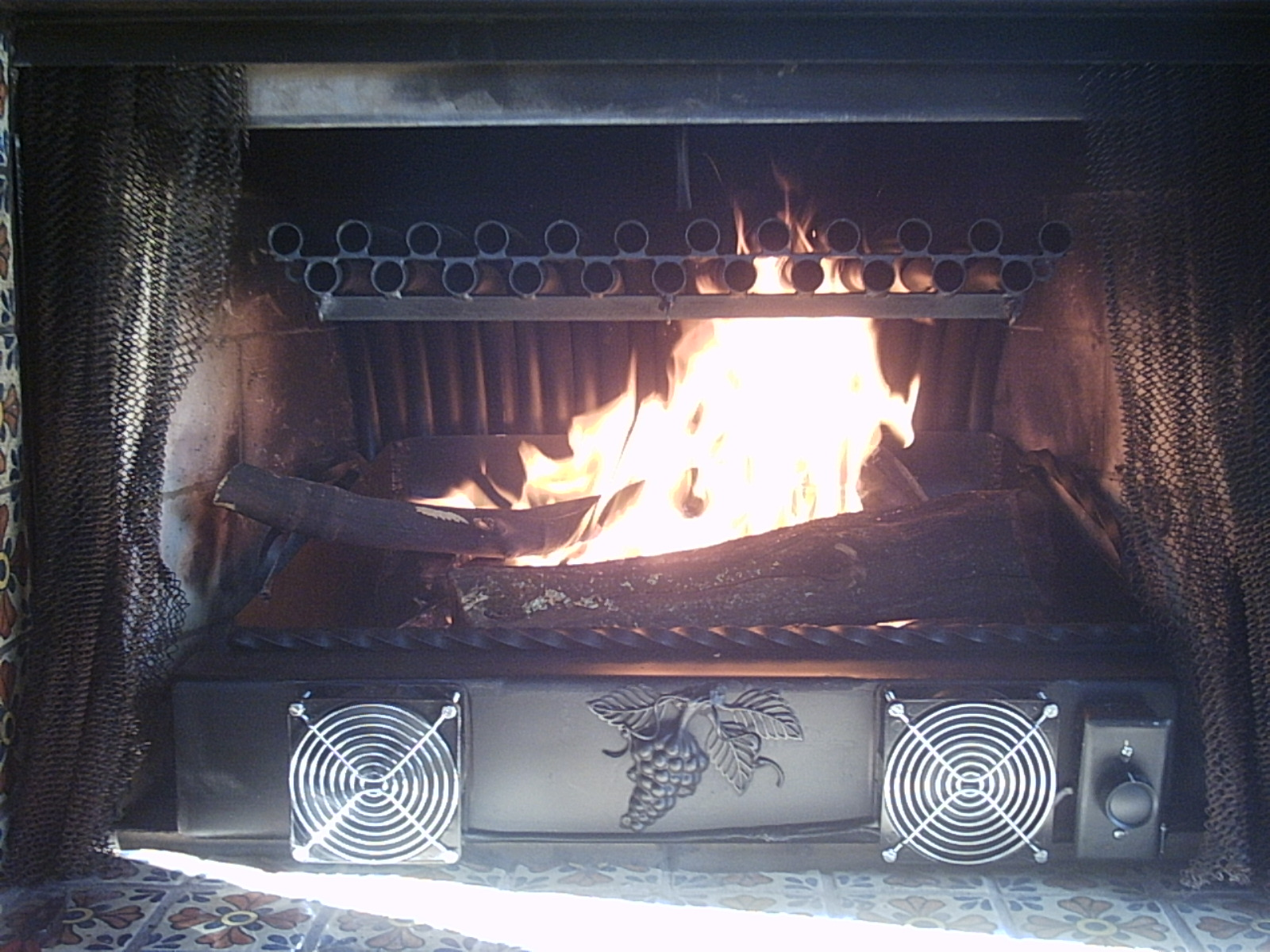
Fireplace with tubular grate heater, with a high surface area in its heat exchanger and a lift out ash tray to simplify cleanup

Some fireplace units incorporate a blower, which transfers more of the fireplace's heat to the air via convection, resulting in a more evenly heated space and a lower heating load. Fireplace efficiency can also be increased with the use of a fireback, a piece of metal that sits behind the fire and reflects heat back into the room. Firebacks are traditionally made from cast iron, but are also made from stainless steel.

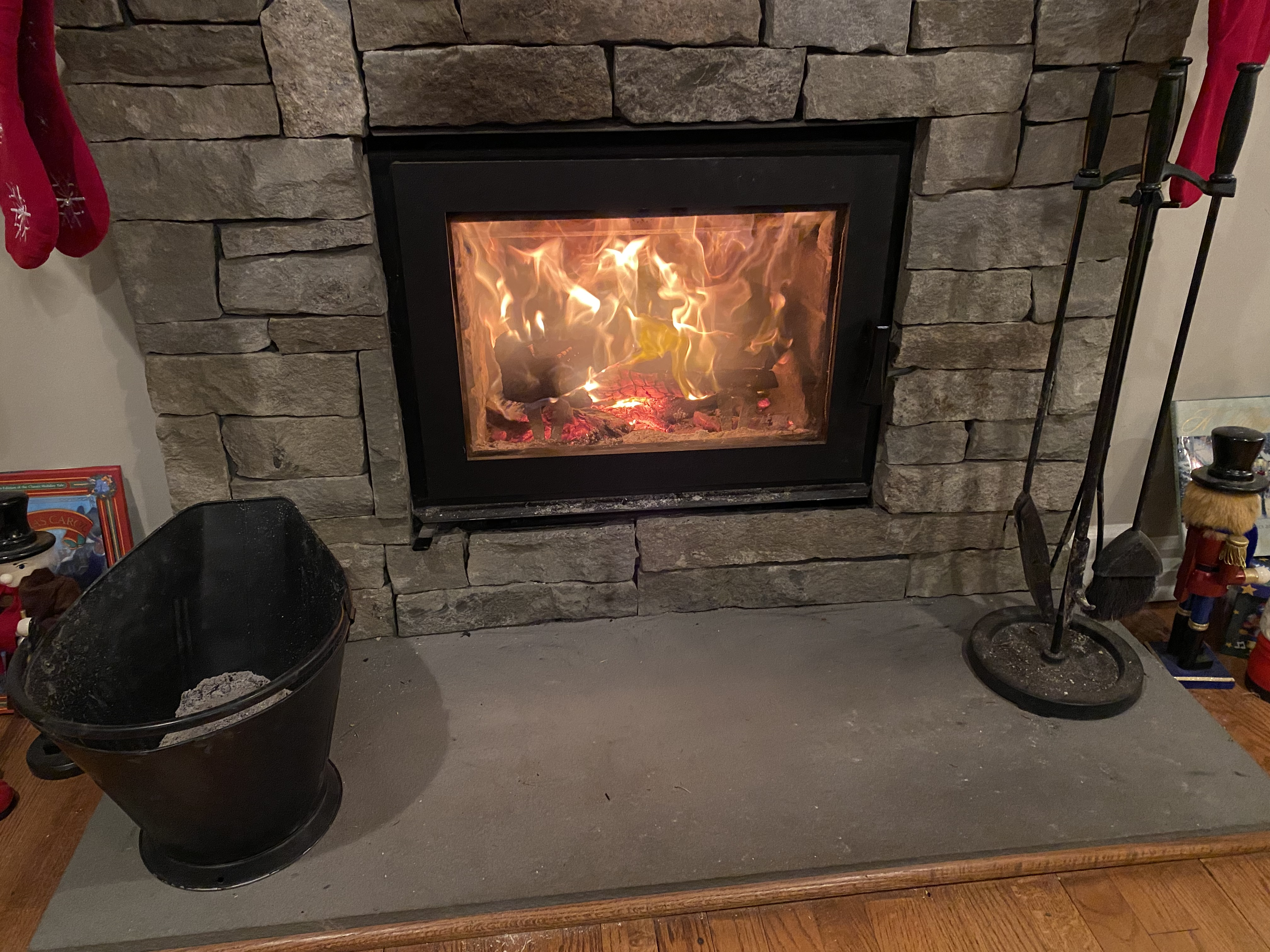
Enclosed wood-fueled fireplace equipped with a blower fan which takes in air through the bottom vent, blows it around the firebox to heat it, and releases it via the top vent

Most older fireplaces have a relatively low efficiency rating. Standard, modern, wood-burning masonry fireplaces though have an efficiency rating of at least 80% (legal minimum requirement, for example, in Salzburg, Austria). To improve efficiency, fireplaces can also be modified by inserting special heavy fireboxes designed to burn much cleaner and can reach efficiencies as high as 80% in heating the air. These modified fireplaces are often equipped with a large fire window, enabling an efficient heating process in two phases. During the first phase the initial heat is provided through a large glass window while the fire is burning. During this time the structure, built of refractory bricks, absorbs the heat. This heat is then evenly radiated for many hours during the second phase. Masonry fireplaces without a glass fire window only provide heat radiated from its surface. Depending on the outside temperature, 1 to 2 daily firings are sufficient to ensure a constant room temperature.

== Health effects ==
=== Wood ===
A literature review published in the Journal of Toxicology and Environmental Health concludes that there are a wide variety of health risks posed by residential wood combustion. It states:

With regard to adults, studies show that prolonged inhalation of wood smoke contributed to chronic bronchitis, chronic interstitial lung disease, pulmonary arterial hypertension and corpulmonale (Pulmonary heart disease), and altered pulmonary immune defense mechanisms. While adverse effects on adults are notable, children appear to be at greatest risk. Many studies that focused specifically on RWC [Residential Wood Combustion] have concluded that young children living in homes heated by a wood-burning stove had a greater occurrence of moderate and severe chronic respiratory symptoms than children of the same age and sex who did not live in homes heated with a wood burning stove. Exposure of preschool children living in homes heated with wood burning stoves or in houses with open fireplaces yielded these effects: decreased pulmonary lung function in young asthmatics; increased incidence of acute bronchitis and severity/frequency of wheezing and coughing; and increased incidence, duration, and possibly severity of acute respiratory infections. Residential wood combustion emissions also contain sulfur oxides, nitrogen oxides, carbon monoxide and potentially carcinogenic compounds including polycyclic aromatic hydrocarbons, benzene, formaldehyde and dioxins. Some of these pollutants are known to cause cancer but their effects on human health via exposure to wood smoke have not been extensively studied.

The Washington State Department of Ecology also published a booklet explaining why wood smoke can be dangerous. It explains that human lung and respiratory systems are unable to filter particulates emitted by wood combustion, which penetrate deeply into the lungs. For months, carcinogens can continue to cause changes and structural damage within the respiratory system. Young children, seniors, pregnant women, smokers and individuals with respiratory diseases are most vulnerable. Wood smoke can cause disease and even death in children, because it is associated with lower respiratory tract infections. Home fireplaces have caused fatal carbon monoxide poisoning.

=== Gases and ethanol ===
Propane, butane, and methane are all flammable gases used in fireplaces (natural gas is mostly methane, liquefied petroleum gas mostly propane). Gases can act as asphyxiant gases (Note: Suffocations may be caused by propane, butane) or cause gas explosions if they are allowed to accumulate unburned. Ethanol (a liquid, also sold in gels) fires can also cause severe burns.

Burning hydrocarbons can decrease indoor air quality. Emissions include airborne particulate matter (such as black carbon) and gases like nitrogen oxide. These weaken the immune system and increase infections, blood pressure, cardiovascular diseases, and insulin resistance. Some forms of fuel are more harmful than others.

Burning hydrocarbon fuels incompletely can produce carbon monoxide, which is highly poisonous and can cause death and long-term neurological disorders.

== Environmental effects ==
Burning any hydrocarbon fuel releases carbon dioxide and water vapor. Other emissions, such as nitrogen oxides and sulfur oxides, can be harmful to the environment.

== Glossary ==
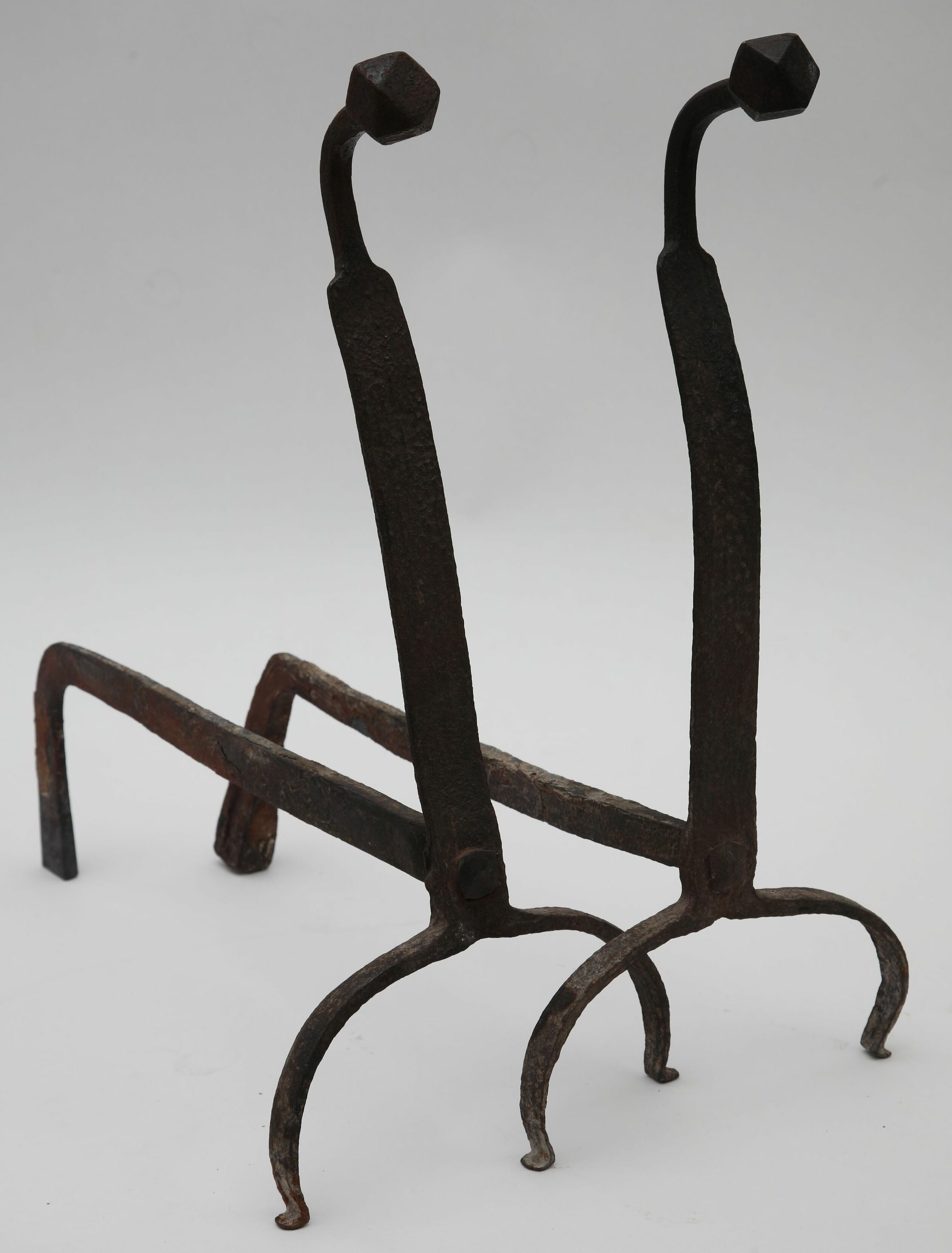
Hand forged andirons

Several of these terms may be compounded with chimney or fireplace such as chimney-back.

- Andiron—Either one of two horizontal metal bars resting on short legs intended to support firewood in a hearth.
- Arch—An arched top of the fireplace opening.
- Ash dump—An opening in a hearth to sweep ashes for later removal from the ash pit.
- Back (fireback)—The inside, rear wall of the fireplace of masonry or metal that reflects heat into the room.
- Brick trimmer—A brick arch supporting a hearth or shielding a joist in front of a fireplace.
- Chimney breast—The part of the chimney which projects into a room to accommodate a fireplace.
- Crane—Metal arms mounted on pintles, which swing and hold pots above a fire.
- Damper—A metal door to close a flue when a fireplace is not in use.
- Flue—The passageway in the chimney.
- Hearth—The floor of a fireplace. The part of a hearth which projects into a room may be called the front or outer hearth.
- Hearthstone—A large stone or other materials used as the hearth material.
- Insert—The fireplace insert is a device inserted into an existing masonry or prefabricated wood fireplace.
- Jamb—The side of a fireplace opening.
- Mantel—Either the shelf above a fireplace or the structure to support masonry above a fireplace
- Smoke shelf—A shelf below the smoke chamber and behind the damper. It collects debris and water falling down the flue.
- Throat (waist)—The narrow area above a fireplace usually where the damper is located.
- Wing—The sides of a fireplace above the opening near the throat.

== See also ==
- Chimney liner
- Fire screen
- Fireplace insert
- Inglenook
- List of home appliances
- Mantel clock
- Micathermic heater
- Oil heater
- Outdoor fireplace
- Rumford fireplace
- Staffordshire dog figurine
- Stone carving
- Wood-burning stove
