= Chimney liner =

Ventilation for hot gases or smoke

A chimney liner is the most operational part of a fireplace despite its relatively simple design. A chimney liner safeguards the chimney structure. The liner accomplishes this as it has a protective barrier that shields the brick and mortar from harm. The liner requires low maintenance and has a long-life expectancy (about 15 to 20 years), and boosts energy efficiency as it is an excellent insulator.

Unfortunately, stone chimneys do deteriorate over time or get damaged. These create health hazards and can cause health problems. These need to be repaired in a cost-effective yet safe way. This is done with stainless steel chimney liners. A stainless-steel chimney flue liner protects the chimney walls from wear and tear and stops carbon monoxide leaks and other dangerous combustion product leaks. Stainless-steel chimney liners have surface and proper sizing to prevent creosote from sticking around. If the chimney already has a stainless-steel chimney liner but the liner is fitted the wrong way up, it needs to be turned around otherwise the chimney can leak tar and condensation.

A flexible flue liner prevents a carbon monoxide leak, chimney fire, or creosote buildup. The creosote build-up is the fuel inside the flue that causes the chimney fire. Most countries have regulations relating to carbon monoxide in the home. Flue liners need to be installed where:

- The chimney leaks smoke and fumes
- There’s condensation or tar seeping through the chimney which causes stains, inside or outside the building
- The flue is too large for the type of burner or stove being used and the smoke cools down and doesn’t go up the chimney properly
- The chimney flue is too cold which is a problem if the flue is on an outside wall and not drawing up the smoke properly or
- The old flue surface is eroded and the roughness causes friction and therefore slows down the smoke, which causes problems

A statutory guidance relating to combustion appliances and fuel storage systems has been issued by the UK Government. Relevant sections are:

- section 1.27:New masonry chimneys should be constructed with flue liners and masonry suitable for the intended application.

- section 1.40: 1.27 New masonry chimneys should be constructed with flue liners and masonry suitable for the intended application.

- section 2.20 : a cast in-situ flue relining system where the material and installation procedures are suitable for use with solid fuel burning appliances and meeting the relevant requirements of BS EN 1857:2003 + A1:2008.

The chimney liners are not hard to fit as they are light and specifically designed for ease of installation. The chimney liner not only improves the energy efficiency of your burner or stove but also means that one doesn’t need to spend anywhere near as much time maintaining the fireplace and keeping it safe. There are numerous documents available relating to the advice and general guidance on the selection and installation of chimneys and flues. There are detailed explanations to attain maximum performance, and optimum safety and durability.

Regarding renovations, there is good advice available as to whether a renovation is necessary and what the cost is to renovate.

== See also ==
- Chimney § Residential flue liners
