= Grate heater =

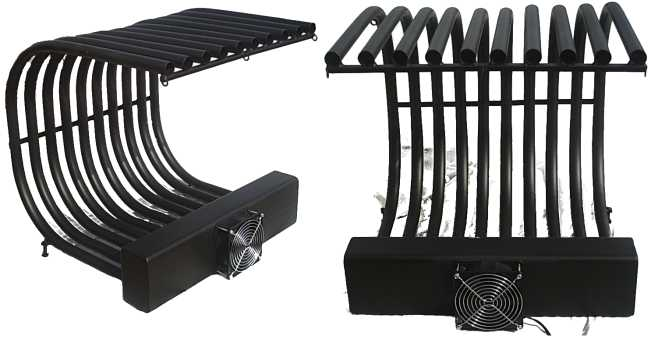
This tubular fireplace grate heater has a large surface area heat exchanger in a compact design, with a fan or blower (fans and blowers are not the same) to multiply the effect of natural convection.

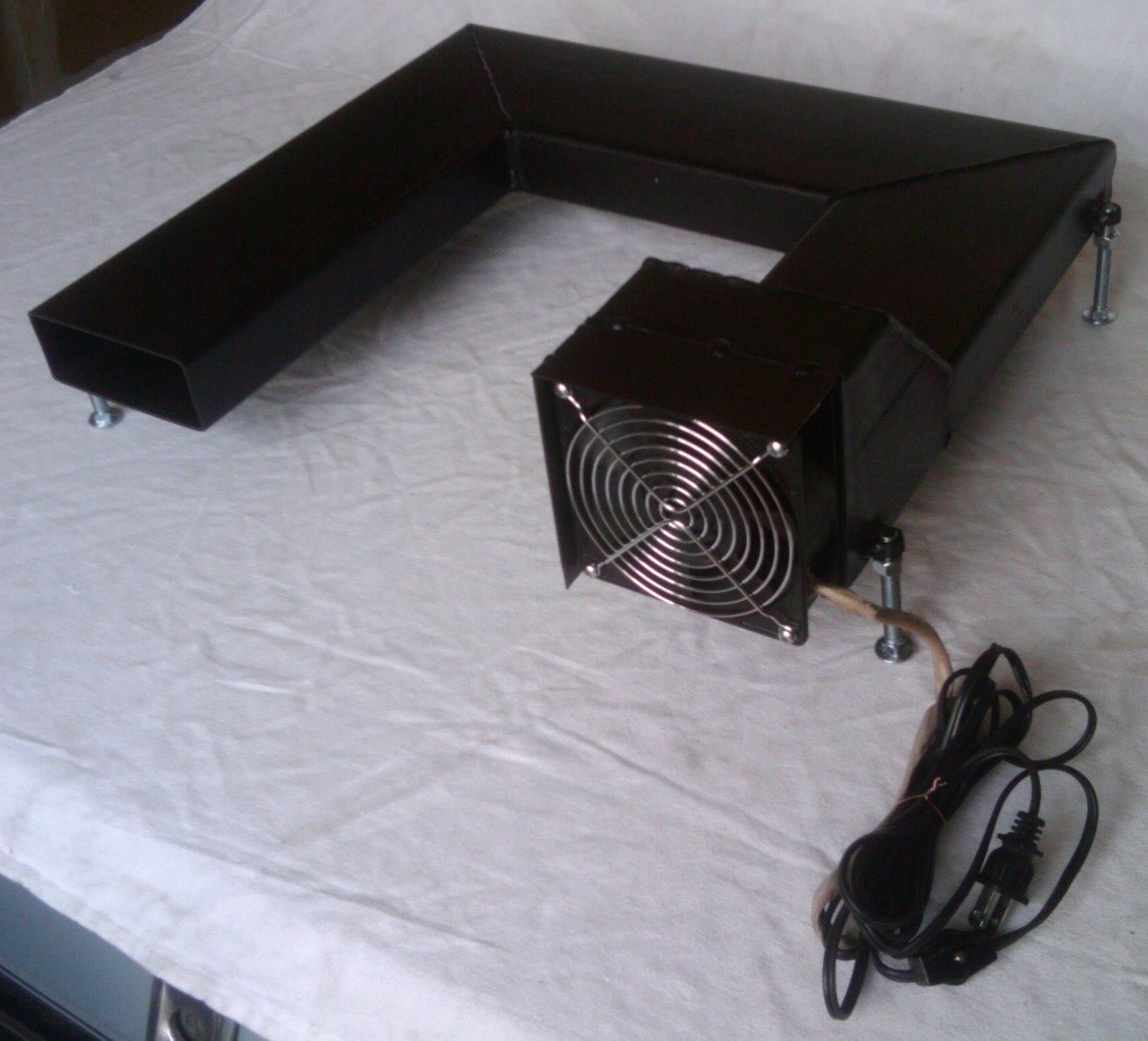
This is a very basic tubular blower that sits under a grate and heats the air being pumped through it from the heat of the coals. It has a high rate of airflow but a small surface area.

A tubular grate heater is any grate or heat exchanger for a fireplace, designed from metal tubing. Through the tubing is circulated home air that becomes heated by the fire, and then vented back into the room and home. It is a heat recovery device that improves the efficiency and ability of a fireplace to get the heat from the fire out and into the home. From simple to ornate, they can contribute significantly to the overall comfort of a room and potentially to a whole house. This in turn will reduce the amount of firewood needed to achieve the same comfort level, potentially reducing heating costs and expenses.

== Mechanism ==
Heaters increase the efficiency of a fireplace and hence the amount of heat that makes it from the fireplace out into the home. They work by having naturally convected and forced air funneled into the metal heat exchanger tubing that is then heated by the coals and/or fire. They draw in cold air from the floor and blow heated air back out into your home. This adds an element of conductive and convective heating to the radiant heat typical of a basic fireplace. Grate heaters have been called many things: heatilator, hearth heater, fireplace blower, fireplace grate heater, Fireplace Furnace, tubular grate heater, etc.

== Standard ==
The ideal tubular grate heater would be built like an ideal heat exchanger with as large a surface area as possible with material suitable to minimize the heaters thermal deterioration yet provide good thermal conductivity with a high airflow rate, similar to your home furnace. However the unique environment of a fireplace and the burning of gas, wood, coal, pellets, etc., require specific heater designs and material construction making few, if any, grate heaters compatible with all fuels.

The most critical elements of any tubular grate heater are:

1. Safety - construction material and method, design and features.
2. Material - quality steel that enhances thermal conductivity, is safe (e.g. galvanized steel sweats lead), and resists thermal deterioration (e.g., tin sheet metal offers little resistance against thermal deterioration).
3. BTU rating - the combination of the unit's fire burning efficiency and the system's ability to deliver high-volume, high-temperature forced air heating into your home.

== Gallery ==
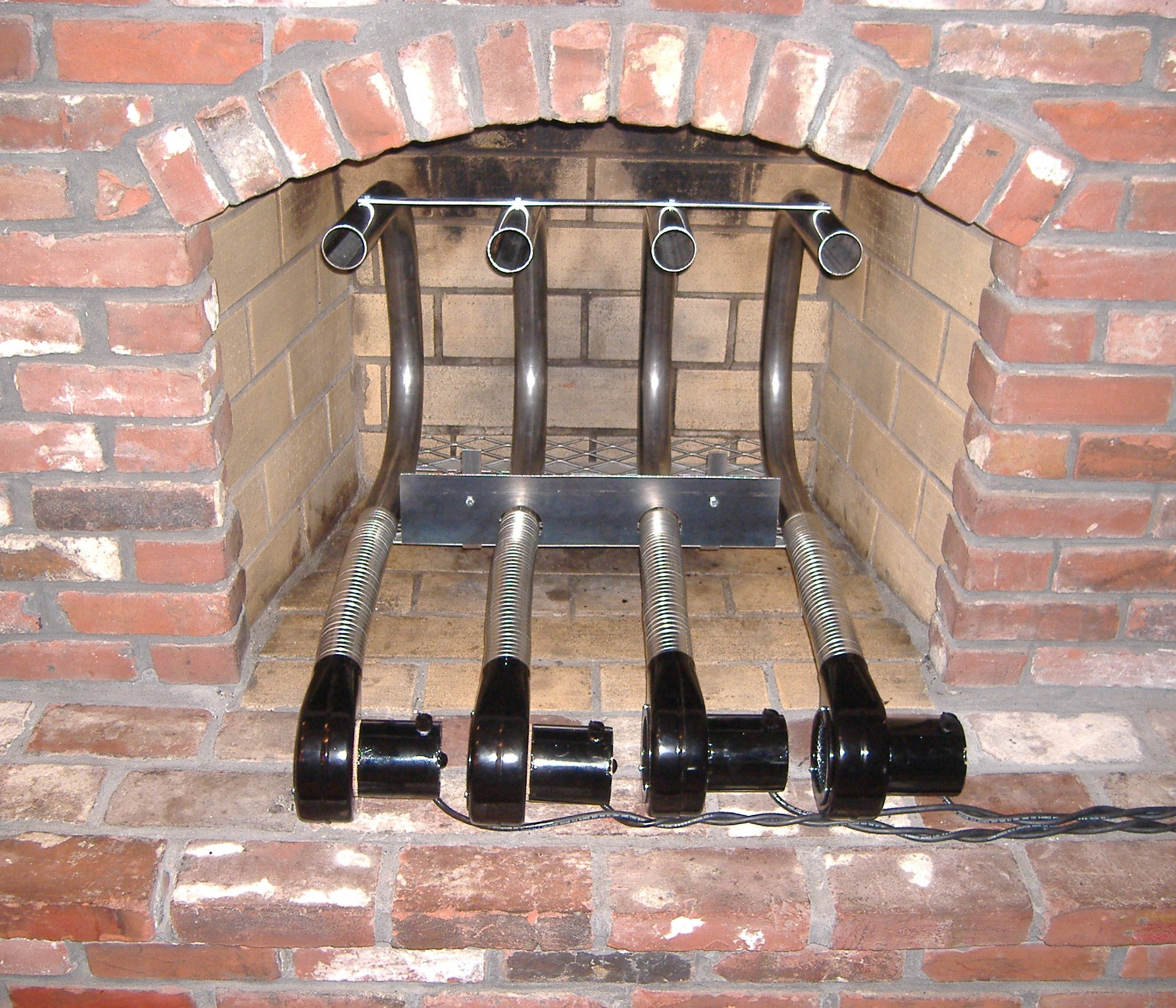
This is a large and powerful grate heater system that incorporates a large, thermally-conductive heating design along with a multi-blower, high-CFM, forced-air delivery system

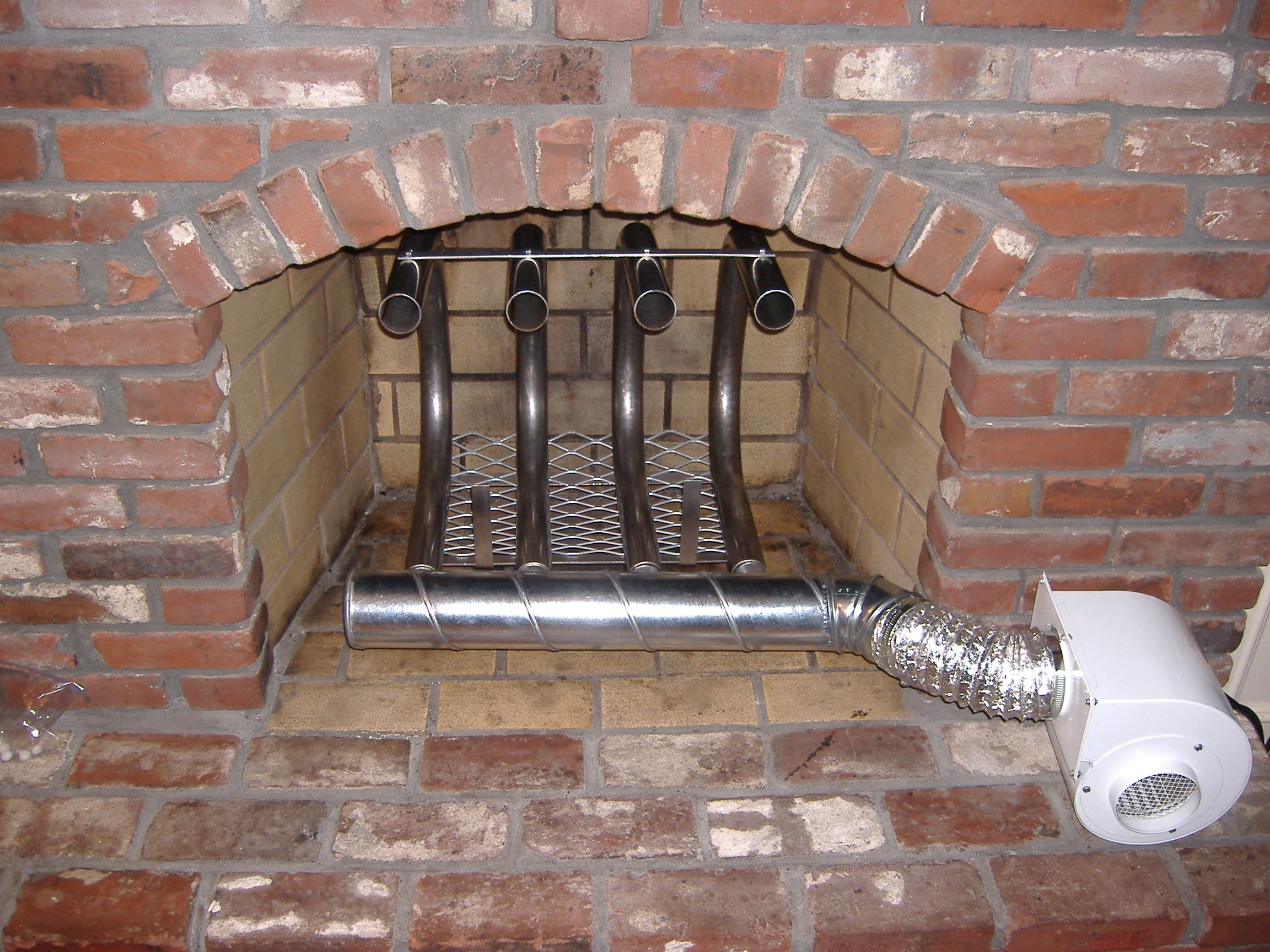
Another example of a large and powerful grate heater system that incorporate a large, thermally-conductive heating design and a single-blower, high-CFM, forced-air delivery system
