= Chimney crane =

Device to hold cooking pots over a fire

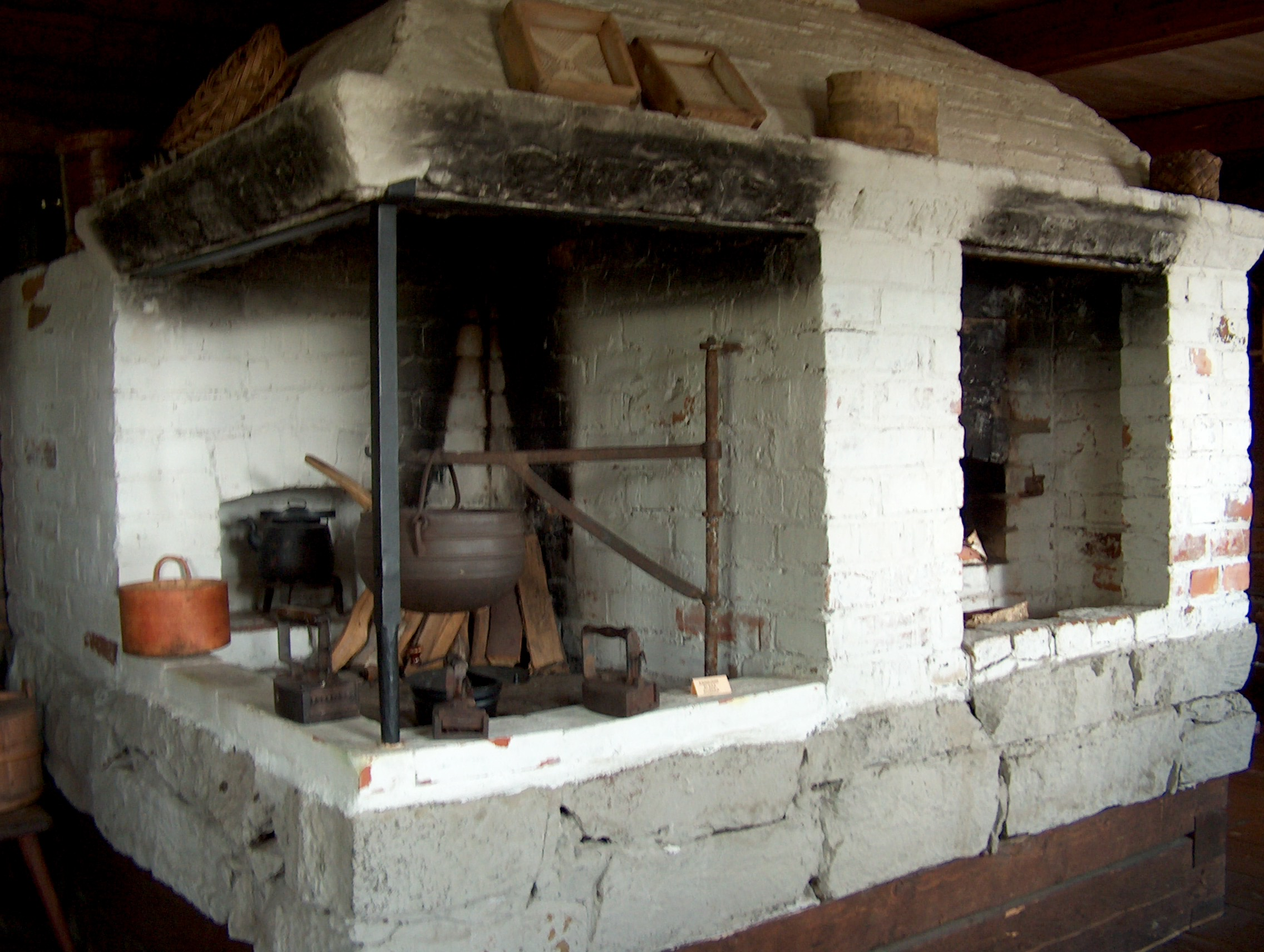
A crane holds one large pot in this raised hearth fireplace in Finland

Chimney cranes, also known as fireplace cranes and pot cranes, are a feature of the homes of the American Colonial period and 18/19th century of Western Europe. Although the chimney crane may be thought by some to be a Yankee invention, it was common in both British and American houses of the era. The purpose of the crane is to allow a cooking pot to be swung away from the fire, preventing burn injuries to the cook as well as regulating temperature of the pot. The chimney crane is an important step in open hearth cooking as it helped save lives and allowed cooks to be more creative.

For centuries before the iron crane was introduced, colonial and European fireplaces used a chain that hung from first a green wooden chimney lug pole then a fixed iron pole directly over the fire. The chimney crane, by contrast, was bolted to the wall and was hinged in order to swing easily. Numerous pots, kettles and other items could be hung on the crane to simmer and cook over the flames.
