= Direct vent fireplace =

Metal fireplace using a direct-vent combustion system

A direct vent fireplace is a prefabricated metal fireplace that employs a direct-vent combustion system. "Direct vent" refers to a sealed-combustion system in which air for combustion is drawn from the outdoors, and waste combustion gasses are exhausted to the outdoors. "Direct vent" does not simply mean that all gasses from combustion are vented to the exterior of the structure in which it is installed.

== Construction ==
The preassembled fireplace unit is made up of two main components: the outer housing, and the flue system.

=== Outer housing ===
The outer housing is the part of the fireplace unit that is installed in the framing of the building. The two main operational components are housed inside of it. The first key component within the outer housing is the firebox, which is surrounded on five sides by the outer housing, and on one side by the glass panel that faces towards the room. This is the space in which the fire burns during operation. Because of this, the gas burners (either natural gas or propane) are located inside of the firebox. To provide a more realistic look, imitation logs and ember material are placed on top of the burners. The ember material, which will not burn, is designed so that it will glow like real embers when heated. The firebox is designed to be smaller than the outer housing so that there is an empty space between the outermost walls of outer housing and the outer walls of the firebox. The empty space in between the firebox and the outer housing is the second important operational component of the outer housing. This space is filled with air from the interior of the room being heated and is used to add hot air to the room without the addition of exhaust gasses from combustion.

=== Flue system ===
The flue system is composed of two flues, the inner flue and the outer flue. The outer flue draws air into the bottom of the sealed firebox to allow for combustion. The inner flue draws hot exhaust gasses from the top of the sealed firebox and vents them directly to the outside of the structure through either an adjacent wall or roof.

== Operation ==
To begin the operation of the fireplace unit, the user must turn on the gas supply and ignite the burners. Once this is done, the unit will operate completely autonomously until the gas supply to the burners is shut off. While in operation, convection will cause the hot air in the firebox to rise to the top of the firebox. As the amount of hot exhaust gasses increases from the combustion process, the hot gas at the top of the firebox is eventually pushed out through the inner flue. At the same time, the removal of the exhaust gasses through the inner flue allows for relatively cold air to be drawn into the firebox through the outer flue.

As the firebox heats up due to the operation of the burners, it radiates heat into the room through the porous glass face that separates the firebox from the inside of the room. At the same time, it transfers heat through the surrounding metal walls into the empty space between itself and the outer housing. This heat transfer creates a convection process inside of the empty space that is very similar to the one that takes place inside of the firebox. Built into the design of the room facing side of the unit are two vents, one at the top and one at the bottom. Once the air in the empty space begins to heat up, convection pushes this heated air further up in the chamber until it is eventually pushed out through the top vent. This phenomenon works in the same way to draw air in through the bottom vent. As the hot air is pushed out, space is emptied in the chamber behind the firebox, which then draws cold air in through the bottom vent.

Both of these convection processes immediately begin to slow down, and eventually stop, as soon as the burners turn off.

== Efficiency ==
Direct vent fireplaces are extremely efficient compared to a traditional fireplace and can operate at about 85% efficiency. Even a very efficient traditional fireplace only operates at about 15% efficiency. This is because most of the hot air generated by the fire travels up the chimney due to convection. A traditional fireplace can also draw hot air in from the room and expel it through the chimney, further lowering the efficiency. The design of the direct vent fireplace allows for such a high level of efficiency because of the sealed firebox. The sealed firebox only allows combustion gasses to leave the system and exit the building. Since it is sealed, no warm air from the room is able to be drawn into the firebox and expelled out of the building.

== Indoor air quality ==
Direct vent fireplaces operate off of propane or natural gas, and are completely sealed from the interior of the building in which they are installed. Thus, no harmful byproducts are released into the room. They also release much less pollution into the atmosphere than a wood-burning fireplace.
