= Micathermic heater =

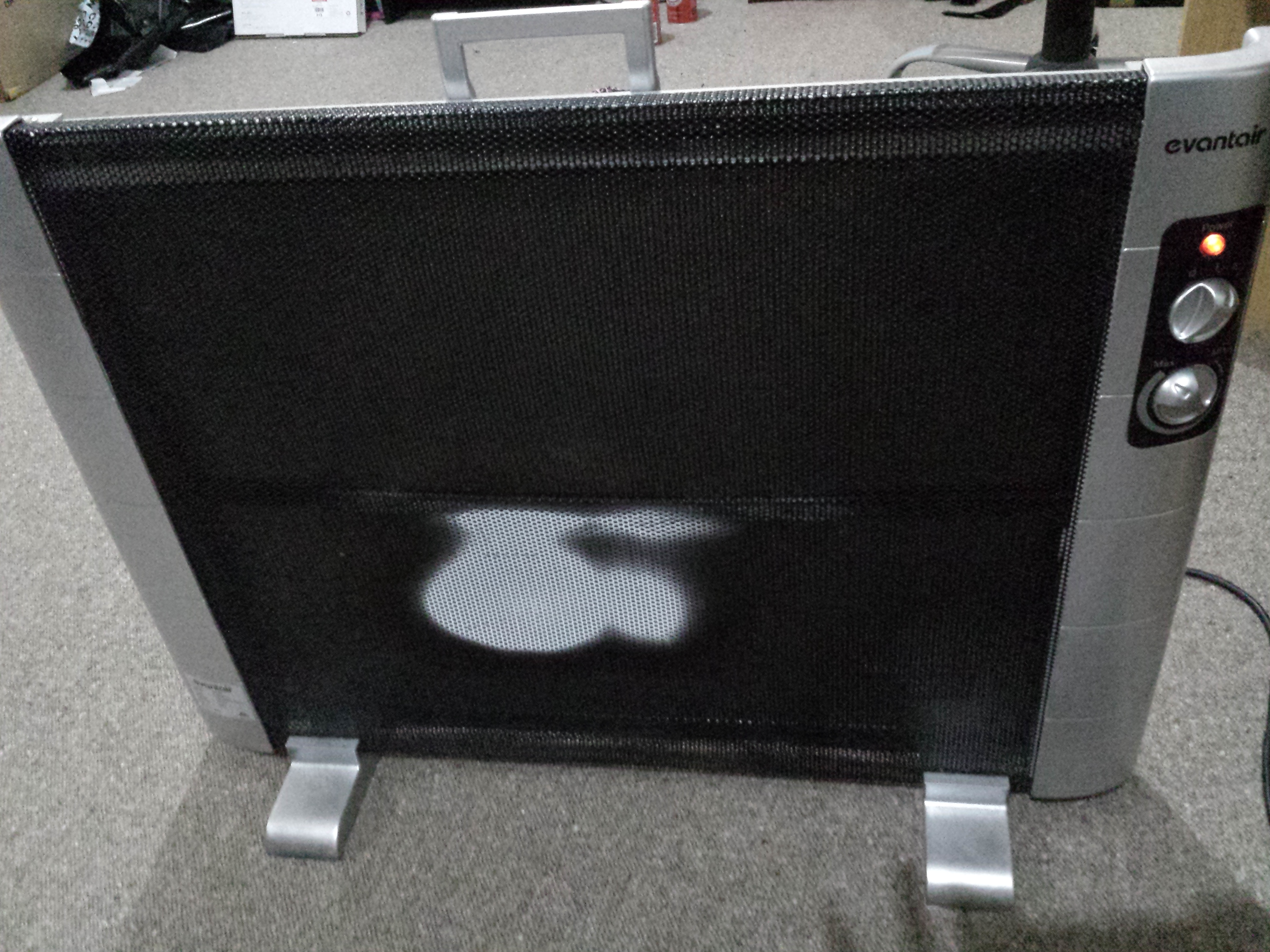
Micathermic heater

A micathermic heater is a type of space heater in which the heating element is covered in thin sheets of mica. Micathermic heaters produce both convection heat and radiant heat, and are usually thinner than other types of heaters.

== Risks ==
The 1500 watt SoleusAir 360 Micathermic Heater was recalled in 2008 due to it being a fire hazard.
