= Pellet basket =

A pellet basket is a small metal basket that sits inside a woodstove or fireplace and holds wood pellets. Pellet baskets convert a non-pellet-burning stove into a pellet stove, allowing a person to heat their home using an existing stove or fireplace.

== Capacity ==
Baskets range in size from 10 to 26 inches and hold from 10 to 30 lbs. of pellet fuel. A fully loaded basket can burn unattended for 2 to 12 hours.

== Maintenance ==
No fan is needed to circulate air within the stove because there is enough air flow through the basket itself to allow pellets to burn with a flame. Wood pellets can be added on top of the hot pellets with a small metal scoop when needed. They may smolder for a few minutes until they ignite. Readjust the air settings for a safe working temperature.

Remove ashes from the bottom of the pellet basket once daily for maximum air flow. Always remember proper wood stove or fireplace maintenance. This includes proper chimney care in order to keep creosote buildup in check. Remove the pellet basket from the wood stove or fireplace to remove ashes.

== See also ==
- Pellet mill
