= Wood fuel =

Wood used as fuel for combustion

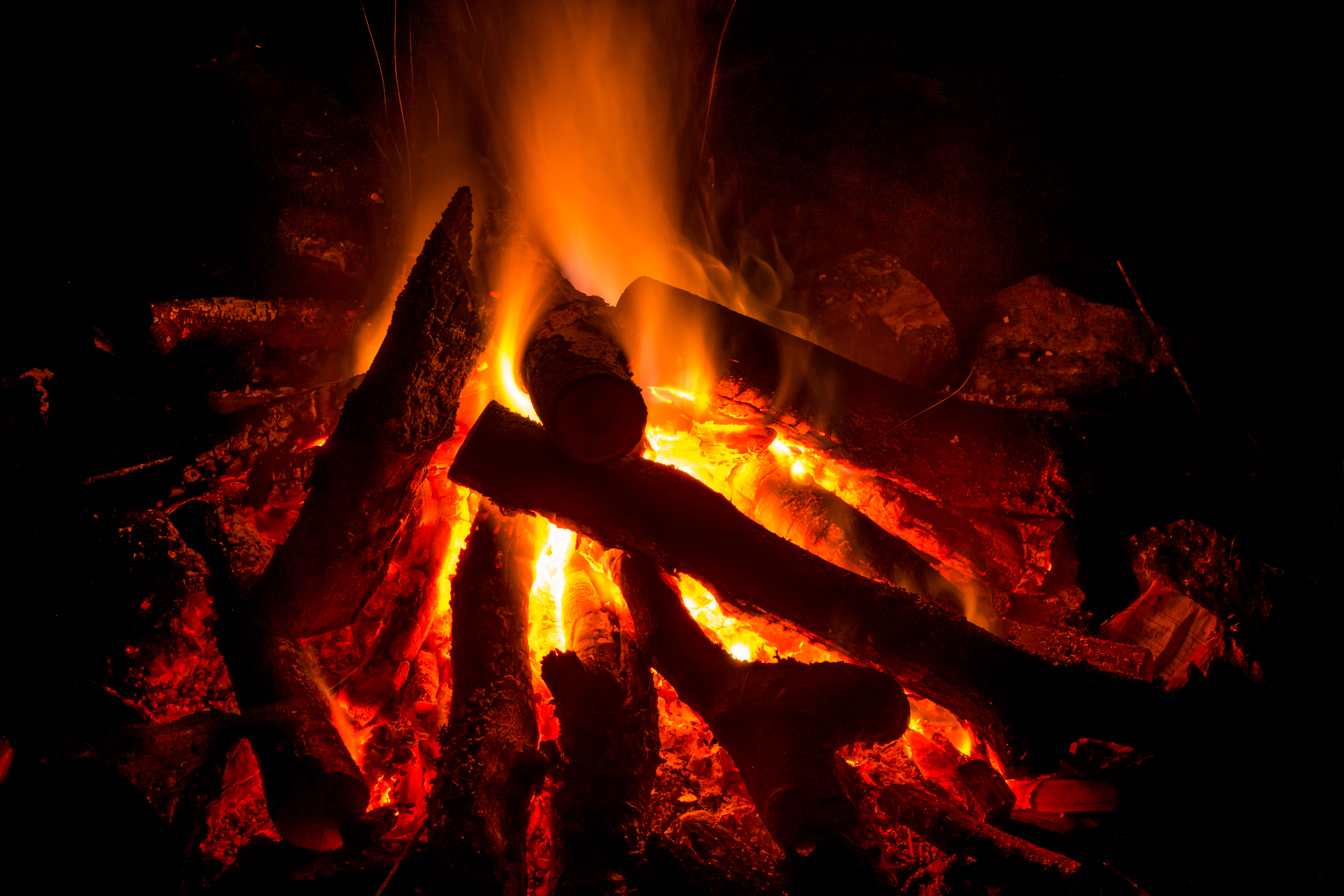
Wood burning

Wood fuel (or fuelwood) is a fuel such as firewood, charcoal, chips, sheets, pellets, and sawdust. The particular form used depends upon factors such as source, quantity, quality and application. In many areas, wood is the most easily available form of fuel, requiring no tools in the case of picking up dead wood, or few tools, although as in any industry, specialized tools, such as skidders and hydraulic wood splitters, have been developed to mechanize production. Sawmill waste and construction industry by-products also include various forms of lumber tailings. About half of wood extracted from forests worldwide is used as fuelwood.

Learning how to start and control fire for heating and cooking is regarded as one of humanity's most important advances. The use of wood as a fuel source for heating is much older than civilization and is assumed to have been used by Neanderthals. Today, burning of wood is the largest use of energy derived from a solid fuel biomass. Wood fuel can be used for cooking and heating, and occasionally for fueling steam engines and steam turbines that generate electricity. Wood may be used indoors in a furnace, stove, or fireplace, or outdoors in furnace, campfire, or bonfire.

== Historical development ==
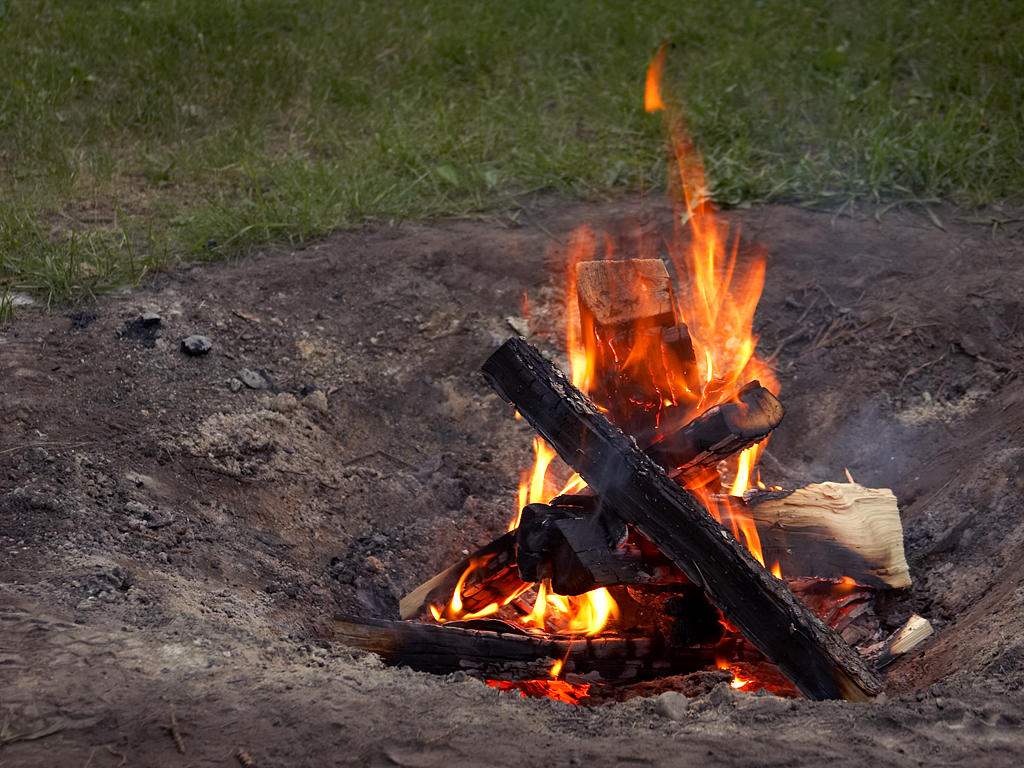
Campfires have been used for ages: fires are integral to humanity.

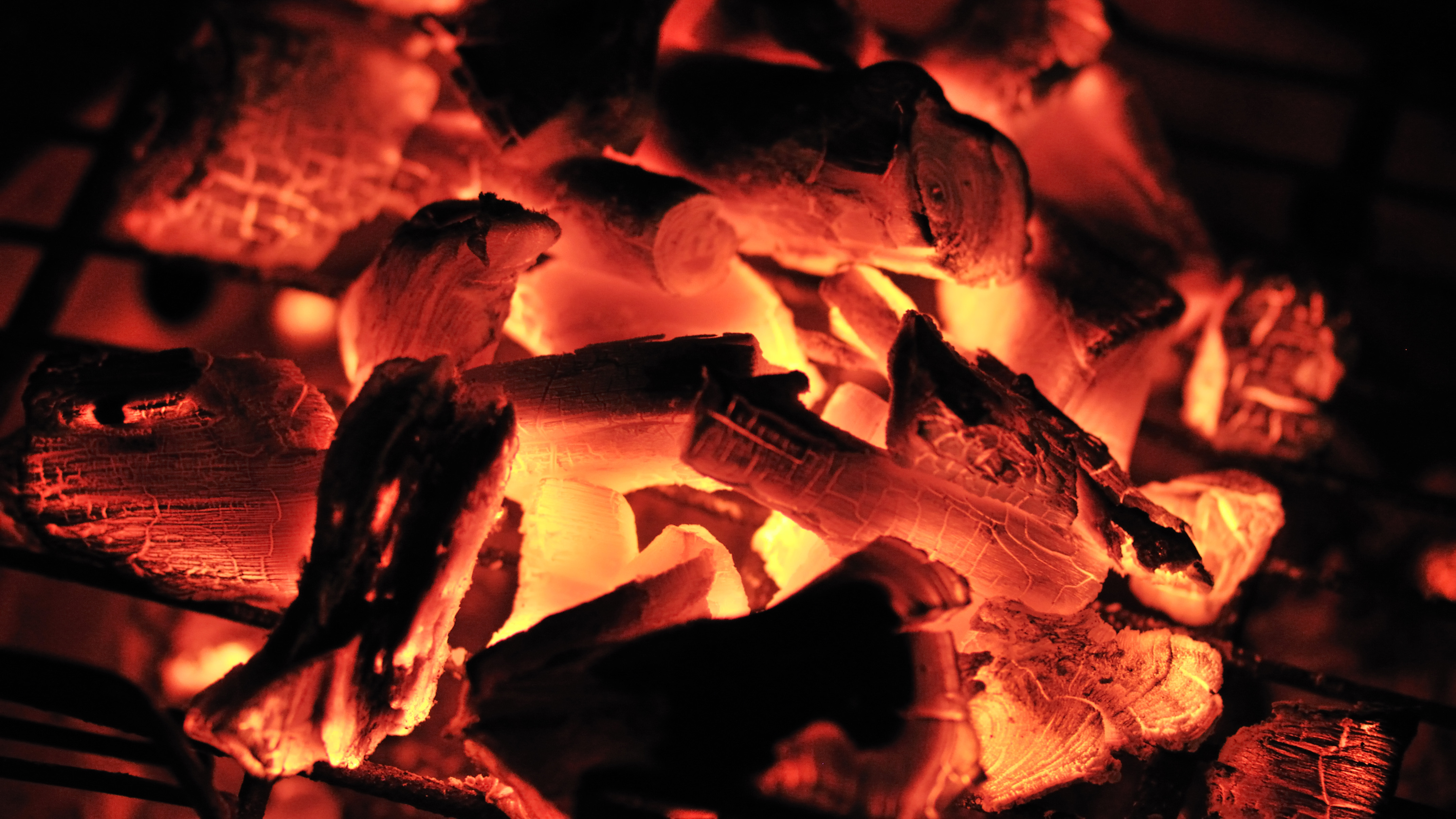
Charcoal, a derivative of wood, was traditionally an important fuel in ironmaking and other processes

Wood has been used as fuel for millennia. Historically, it was limited in use only by the distribution of technology required to make a spark. Heat derived from wood is still common throughout much of the world. Early examples included a fire constructed inside a tent. Fires were constructed on the ground, and a smoke hole in the top of the tent allowed the smoke to escape by convection.

In permanent structures and in caves, hearths were constructed or established—surfaces of stone or another noncombustible material upon which a fire could be built. Smoke escaped through a smoke hole in the roof.

In contrast to civilizations in relatively arid regions (such as Mesopotamia and Egypt), the Greeks, Romans, Celts, Britons, and Gauls all had access to forests suitable for using as fuel. Over the centuries there was a partial deforestation of climax forests and the evolution of the remainder to coppice with standards woodland as the primary source of wood fuel. These woodlands involved a continuous cycle of new stems harvested from old stumps, on rotations between seven and thirty years.

One of the earliest printed books on woodland management, in English, was John Evelyn's Sylva, or A Discourse of Forest-Trees (1664) advising landowners on the proper management of forest estates. H. L. Edlin, in "Woodland Crafts in Britain", 1949 outlines the extraordinary techniques employed, and range of wood products that have been produced from these managed forests since pre-Roman times. And throughout this time the preferred form of wood fuel was the branches of cut coppice stems bundled into faggots. Larger, bent or deformed stems that were of no other use to the woodland craftsmen were converted to charcoal.

As with most of Europe, these managed woodlands continued to supply their markets right up to the end of World War Two. Since then much of these woodlands have been converted to broadscale agriculture. Total demand for fuel increased considerably with the Industrial Revolution but most of this increased demand was met by the new fuel source coal, which was more compact and more suited to the larger scale of the new industries.

During the Edo period of Japan, wood was used for many purposes, and the consumption of wood led Japan to develop a forest management policy during that era. Demand for timber resources was on the rise not only for fuel, but also for construction of ships and buildings, and consequently deforestation was widespread. As a result, forest fires occurred, along with floods and soil erosion. Around 1666, the shōgun made it a policy to reduce logging and increase the planting of trees. This policy decreed that only the shōgun, or a daimyō, could authorize the use of wood. By the 18th century, Japan had developed detailed scientific knowledge about silviculture and plantation forestry.

== Fireplaces and stoves ==
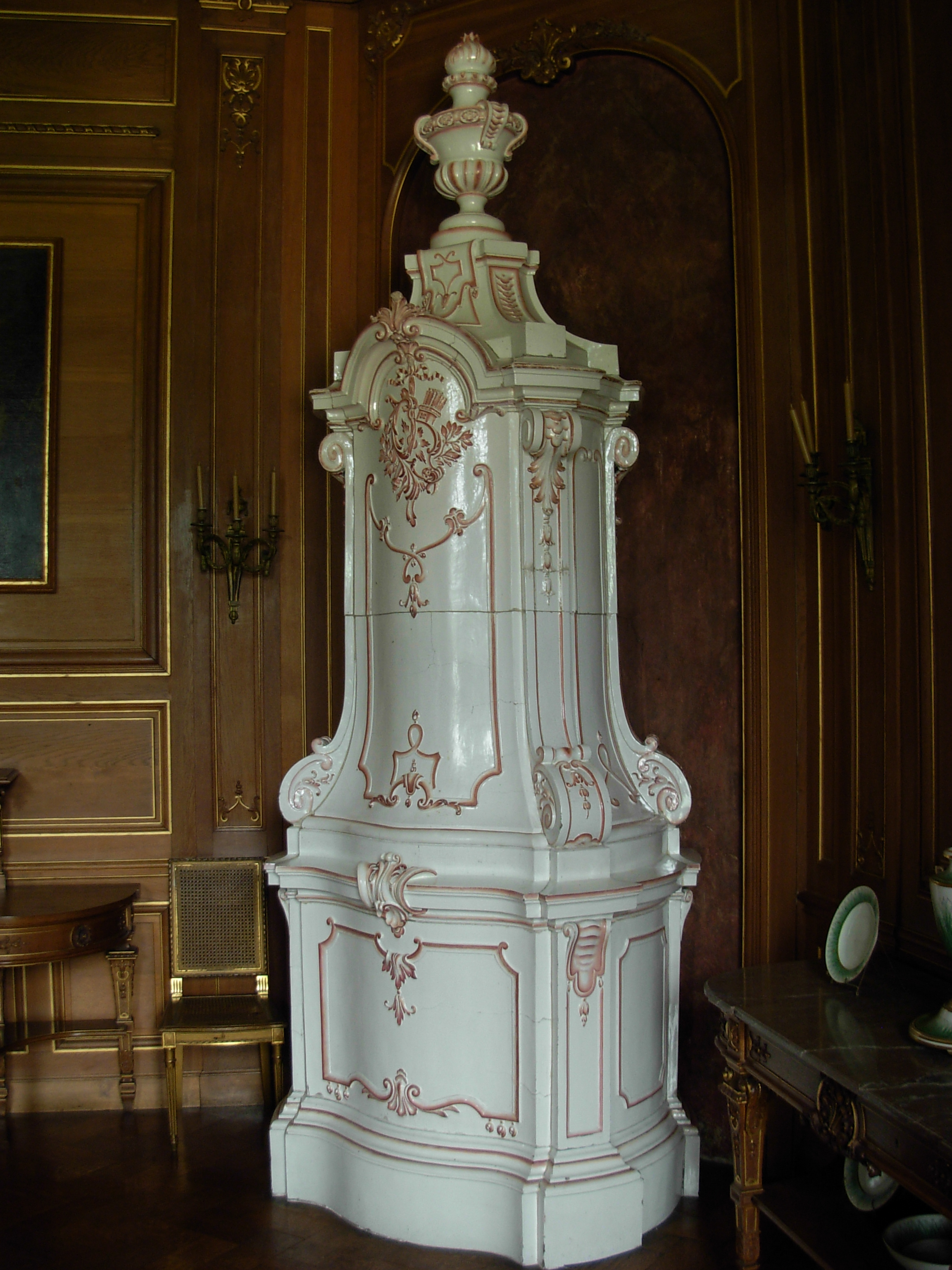
Ceramic stoves are traditional in Northern Europe: an 18th-century faience stove at Łańcut Castle, Poland

The development of the chimney and the fireplace allowed for more effective exhaustion of the smoke. Masonry heaters or stoves went a step further by capturing much of the heat of the fire and exhaust in a large thermal mass, becoming much more efficient than a fireplace alone.

The metal stove was a technological development concurrent with the Industrial Revolution. Stoves were manufactured or constructed pieces of equipment that contained the fire on all sides and provided a means for controlling the draft—the amount of air allowed to reach the fire. Stoves have been made of a variety of materials. Cast iron is among the more common. Soapstone (talc), tile, and steel have all been used. Metal stoves are often lined with refractory materials such as firebrick, since the hottest part of a woodburning fire will burn away steel over the course of several years' use.

The Franklin stove was developed in the United States by Benjamin Franklin. More a manufactured fireplace than a stove, it had an open front and a heat exchanger in the back that was designed to draw air from the cellar and heat it before releasing it out the sides. The heat exchanger was never a popular feature and was omitted in later versions. So-called "Franklin" stoves today are made in a great variety of styles, though none resembles the original design.

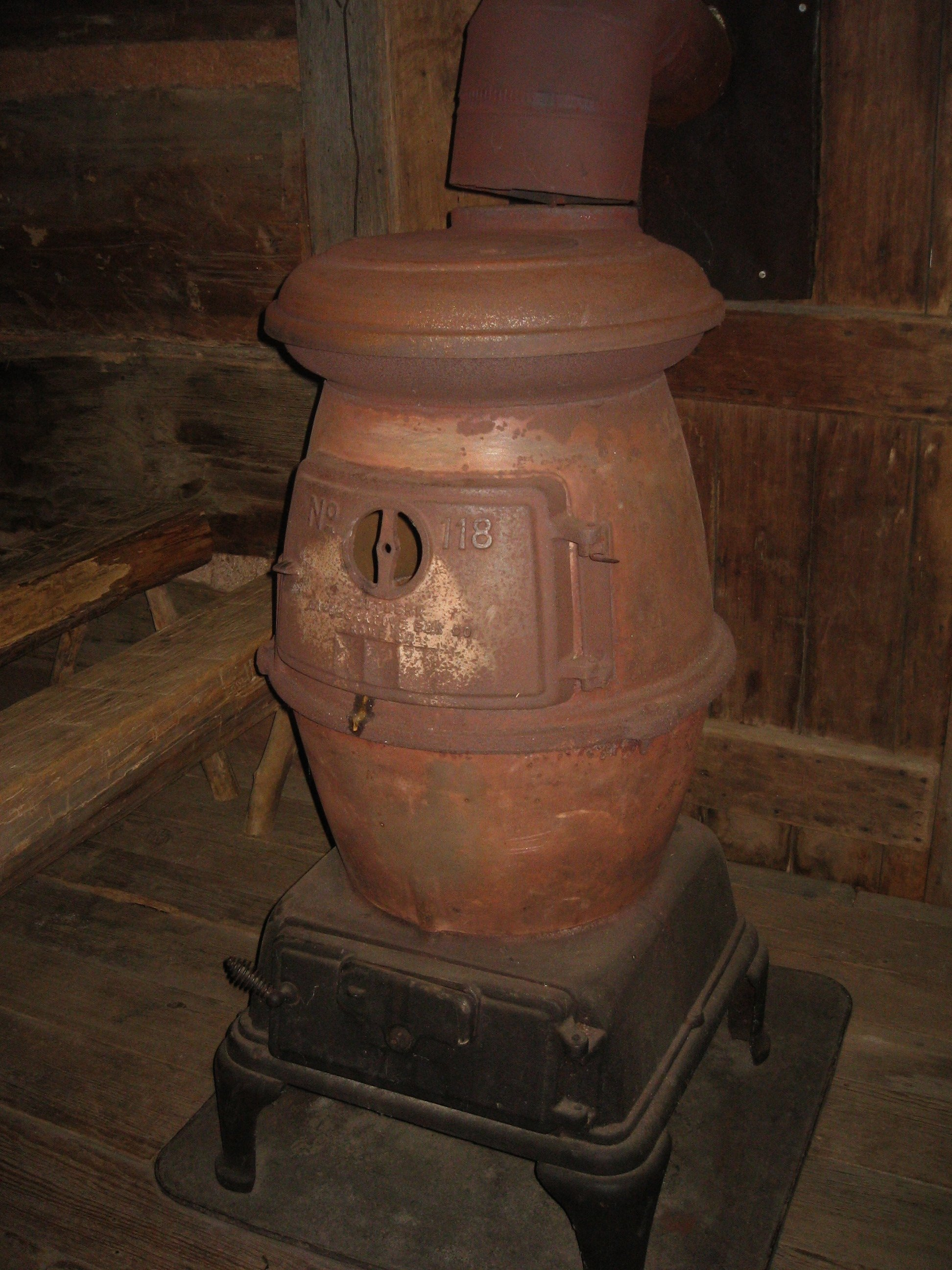
Potbelly stove at the Museum of Appalachia

The 1800s became the high point of the cast iron stove. Each local foundry would make their own design, and stoves were built for myriads of purposes—parlour stoves, box stoves, camp stoves, railroad stoves, portable stoves, cooking stoves and so on. Elaborate nickel and chrome edged models took designs to the edge, with cast ornaments, feet and doors. Wood or coal could be burnt in the stoves and thus they were popular for over one hundred years. The action of the fire, combined with the causticity of the ash, ensured that the stove would eventually disintegrate or crack over time. Thus a steady supply of stoves was needed. The maintenance of stoves, needing to be blacked, their smokiness, and the need to split wood meant that oil or electric heat found favour.

The airtight stove, originally made of steel, allowed greater control of combustion, being more tightly fitted than other stoves of the day. Airtight stoves became common in the 19th century.

Use of wood heat declined in popularity with the growing availability of other, less labor-intensive fuels. Wood heat was gradually replaced by coal and later by fuel oil, natural gas and propane heating except in rural areas with available forests.

After the 1967 Oil Embargo, many people in the United States used wood as fuel for the first time. The EPA provided information on clean stoves, which burned much more efficiently.

== 1970s ==
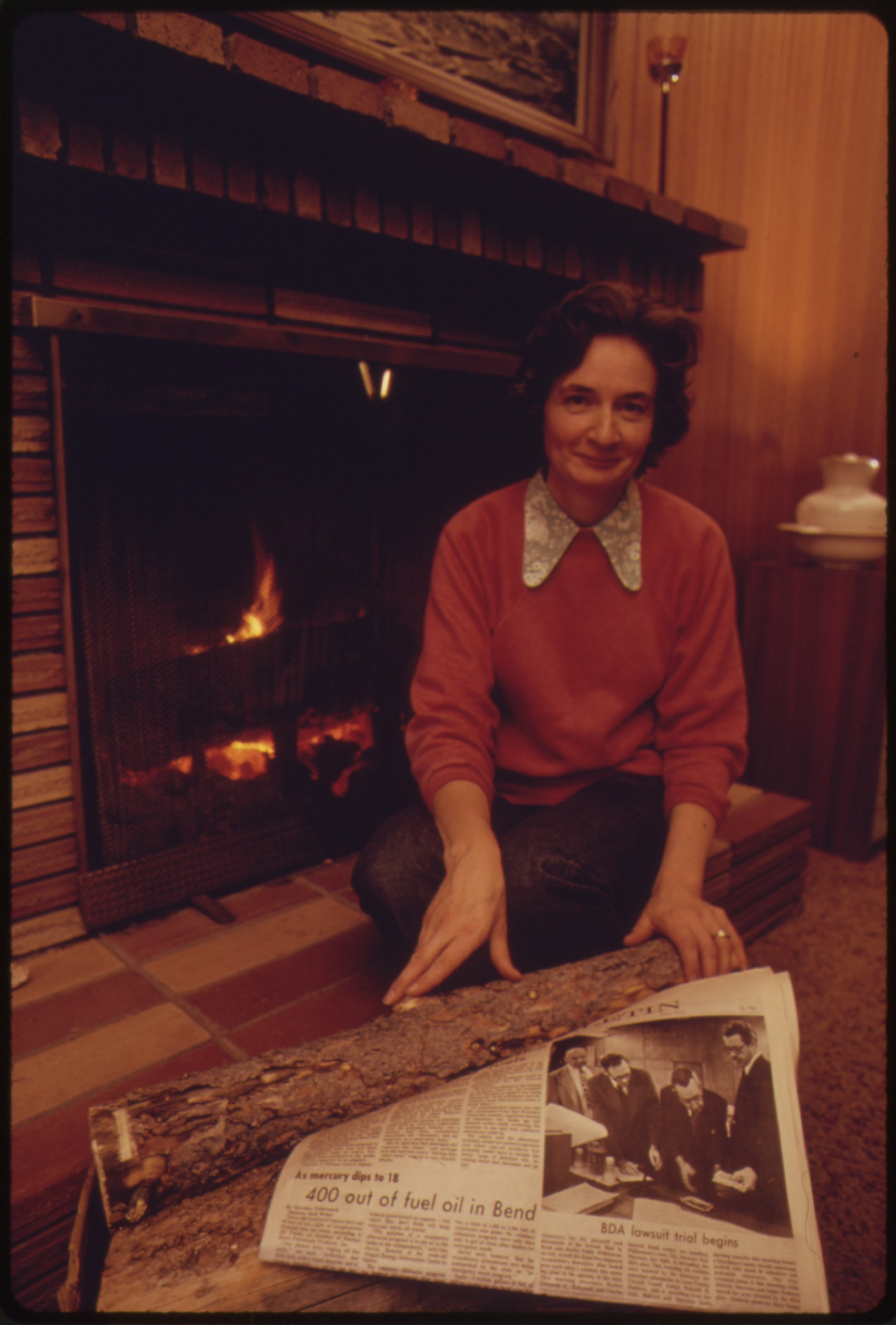
A woman uses wood in a fireplace for heat. A newspaper headline before her tells of the community's lack of heating oil in 1973.

A brief resurgence in popularity occurred during and after the 1973 energy crisis, when some believed that fossil fuels would become so expensive as to preclude their use. A period of innovation followed, with many small manufacturers producing stoves based on designs old and new. Notable innovations from that era include the Ashley heater, a thermostatically controlled stove with an optional perforated steel enclosure that prevented accidental contact with hot surfaces. The decade also saw a number of dual-fuel furnaces and boilers made, which utilized ductwork and piping to deliver heat throughout a house or other building.

== 1980s ==
The growth in popularity of wood heat also led to the development and marketing of a greater variety of equipment for cutting, splitting and processing firewood. Consumer grade hydraulic log splitters were developed to be powered by electricity, gasoline, or PTO of farm tractors. In 1987 the US Department of Agriculture published a method for producing kiln dried firewood, on the basis that better heat output and increased combustion efficiency can be achieved with logs containing lower moisture content.

The magazine "Wood Burning Quarterly" was published for several years before changing its name to "Home Energy Digest" and, subsequently, disappearing.

== Today ==
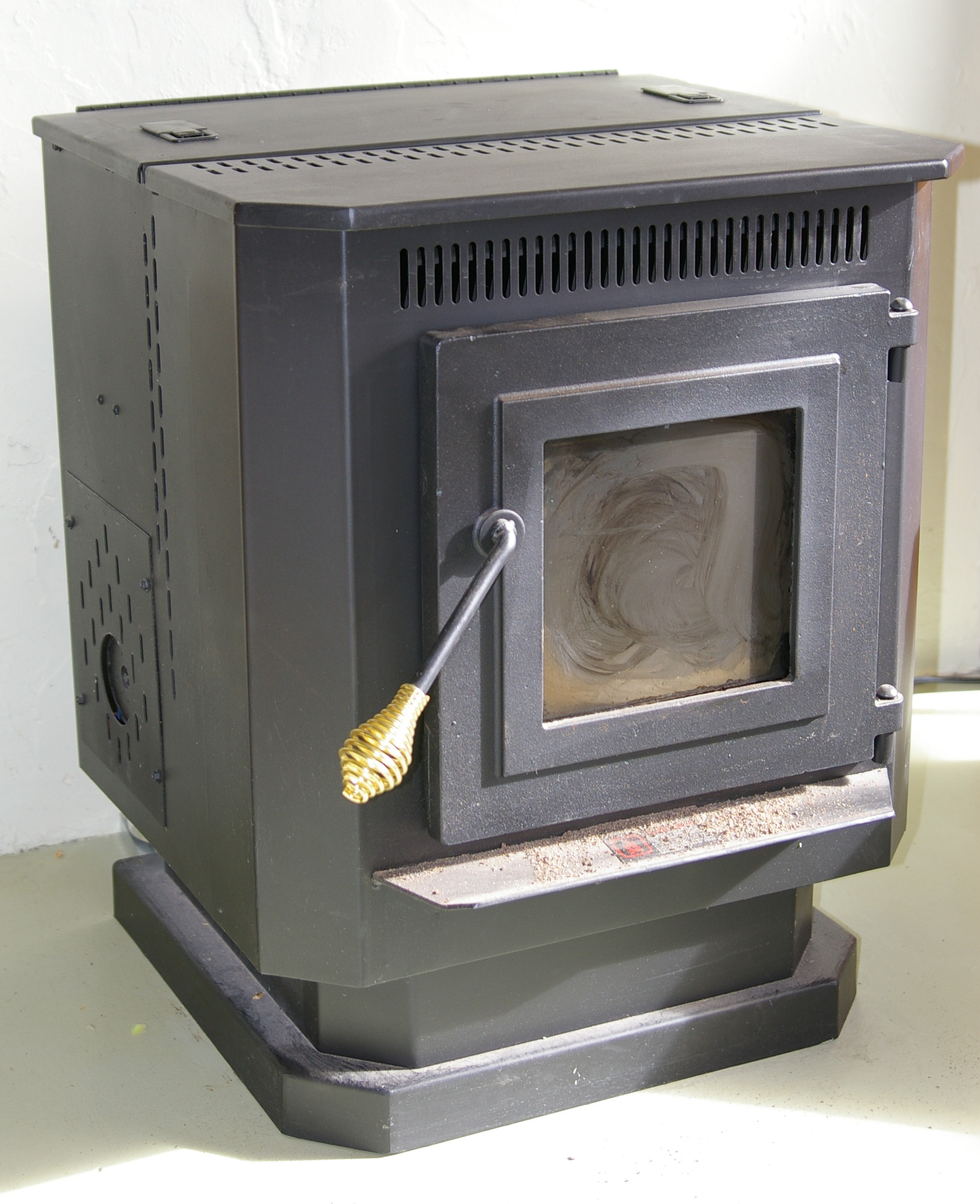
A wood pellet stove

Many lower- and middle-income countries rely on wood for energy purposes (especially cooking). The largest producers are all in these income groups and have large populations with a high reliance on wood for energy: in 2023, India ranked first with 298 million m3 (15% of total production), followed by China with 148 million m3 and Brazil with 132 million m3 (respectively 8% and 7% of global production).

A pellet stove is an appliance that burns compressed wood or biomass pellets. Wood heat continues to be used in areas where firewood is abundant. For serious attempts at heating, rather than mere ambience (open fireplaces), stoves, fireplace inserts, and furnaces are most commonly used today. In rural, forested parts of the U.S., freestanding boilers are increasingly common. They are installed outdoors, some distance from the house, and connected to a heat exchanger in the house using underground piping.

The mess of wood, bark, smoke, and ashes is kept outside and the risk of fire is reduced. The boilers are large enough to hold a fire all night and can burn larger pieces of wood, thus less cutting and splitting is required. There is no need to retrofit a chimney in the house. However, outdoor wood boilers emit more wood smoke and associated pollutants than other wood-burning appliances. This is due to design characteristics such as the water-filled jacket surrounding the firebox, which acts to cool the fire and leads to incomplete combustion. Outdoor wood boilers also typically have short stack heights in comparison to other wood-burning appliances, contributing to ambient levels of particulates at ground level. An increasingly popular alternative is the wood gasification boiler, which burns wood at very high efficiencies (85-91%) and can be placed indoors or in an outbuilding.

There are numerous ways to process wood fuel, and wood is still used today for cooking in many places, either in a stove or an open fire. It is also used as a fuel in many industrial processes, including smoking meat and making maple syrup. As a sustainable energy source, wood fuel also remains viable for generating electricity in areas with easy access to forest products and by-products.

== Measurement of firewood ==
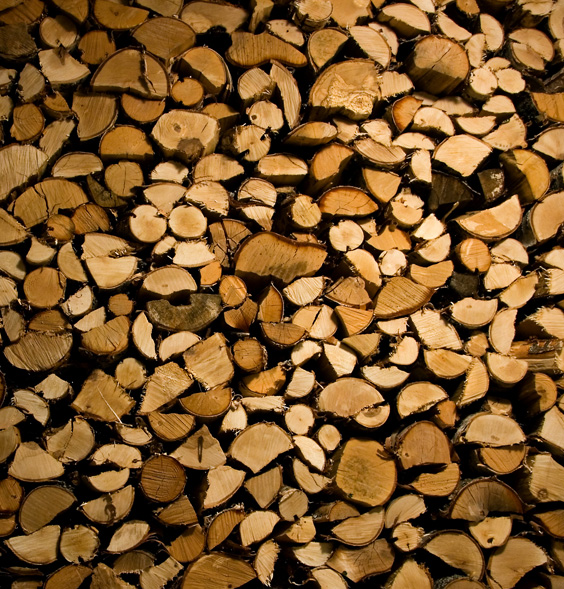
Stapled birch wood

In the metric system, firewood is normally sold by the cubic metre or stere (1 m^{3} ≈ 0.276 cords).

In the United States and Canada, firewood is usually sold by the cord, 128 ft^{3} (3.62 m^{3}), corresponding to a woodpile 8 ft wide × 4 ft high of 4 ft-long logs. The cord is legally defined by statute in most U.S. states. A "thrown cord" is firewood that has not been stacked and is defined as 4 ft wide × 4 ft tall × 10 ft long. The additional volume is to make it equivalent to a standard stacked cord, where there is less void space. It is also common to see wood sold by the "face cord", which is usually not legally defined, and varies from one area to another. For example, in one state a pile of wood 8 feet wide × 4 feet high of 16 inch-long logs will often be sold as a "face cord", though its volume is only one-third of a cord. In another state, or even another area of the same state, the volume of a face cord may be considerably different. Hence, it is risky to buy wood sold in this manner, as the transaction is not based on a legally enforceable unit of measure.

In Australia, firewood is normally sold by the tonne, but is commonly advertised as sold by the barrowload (wheelbarrow), bucket (1/3 of a 1 m^{3} bucket of a typical skid-steer), ute-load or bag (roughly 15–20 kg).

== Energy content ==
A common hardwood, red oak, has an energy content (heat value) of 14.9 megajoules per kilogram (6,388 BTU per pound), and 10.4 megajoules recoverable if burned at 70% efficiency.

The Sustainable Energy Development Office (SEDO), part of the Government of Western Australia states that the energy content of wood is 16.2 megajoules per kilogram (4.5 kWh/kg).

According to The Bioenergy Knowledge Centre, the energy content of wood is more closely related to its moisture content than its species. The energy content improves as moisture content decreases.

In 2008, wood for fuel cost $15.15 per 1 million BTUs (0.041 EUR per kWh).

== Environmental impacts ==
=== Combustion by-products ===
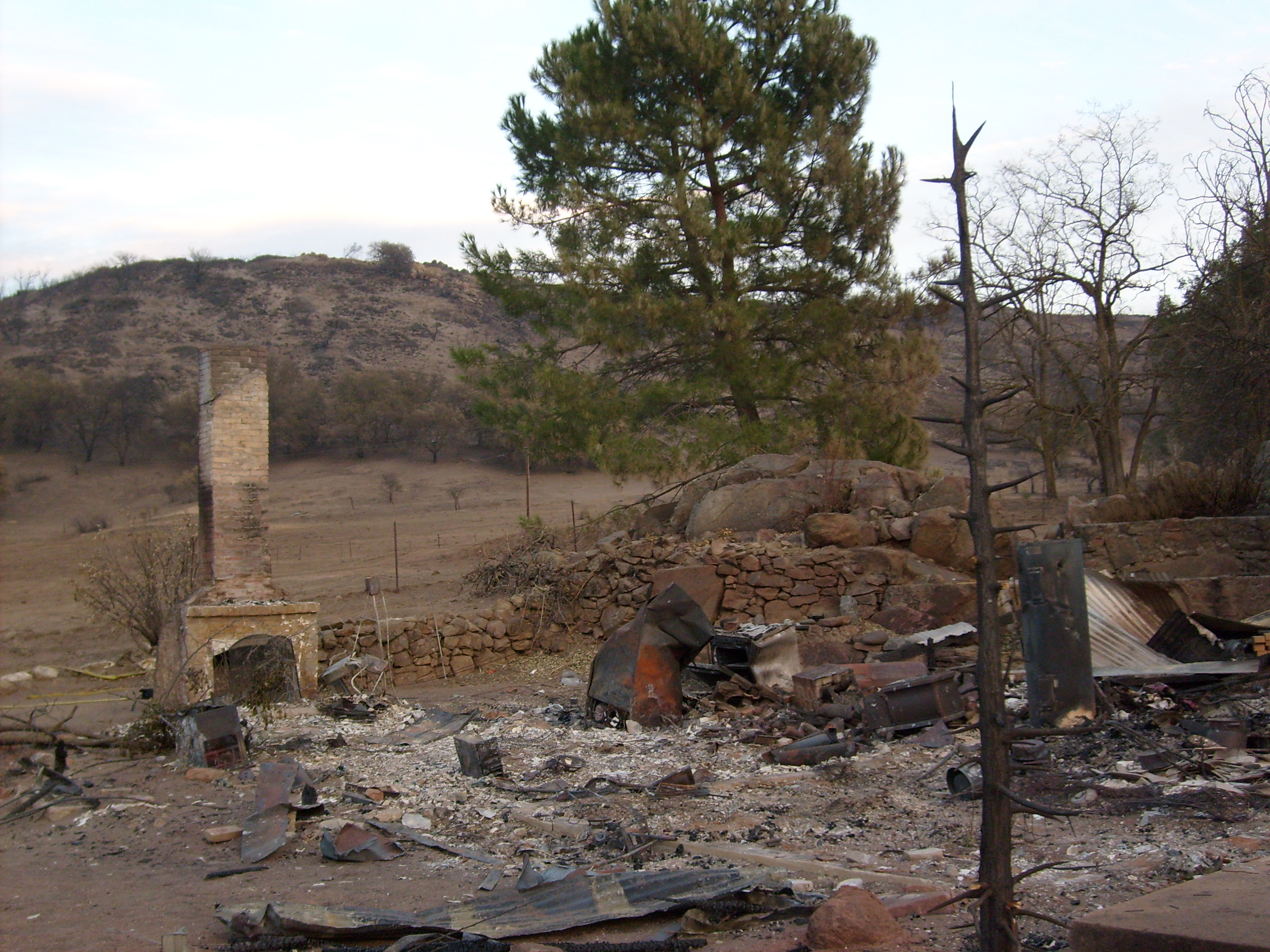
Fireplace and chimney after a wildfire, Witch Fire, California

As with any fire, burning wood fuel creates numerous by-products, some of which may be useful (heat and steam), and others that are undesirable, irritating or dangerous.

One by-product of wood burning is wood ash, which in moderate amounts is a fertilizer (mainly potash), contributing minerals, but is strongly alkaline as it contains potassium hydroxide (lye). Wood ash can also be used to manufacture soap.

Smoke, containing water vapor, carbon dioxide and other chemicals and aerosol particulates, including caustic alkali fly ash, which can be an irritating (and potentially dangerous) by-product of partially burnt wood fuel. A major component of wood smoke is fine particles that may account for a large portion of particulate air pollution in some regions. During cooler months, wood heating accounts for as much as 60% of fine particles in Melbourne, Australia.

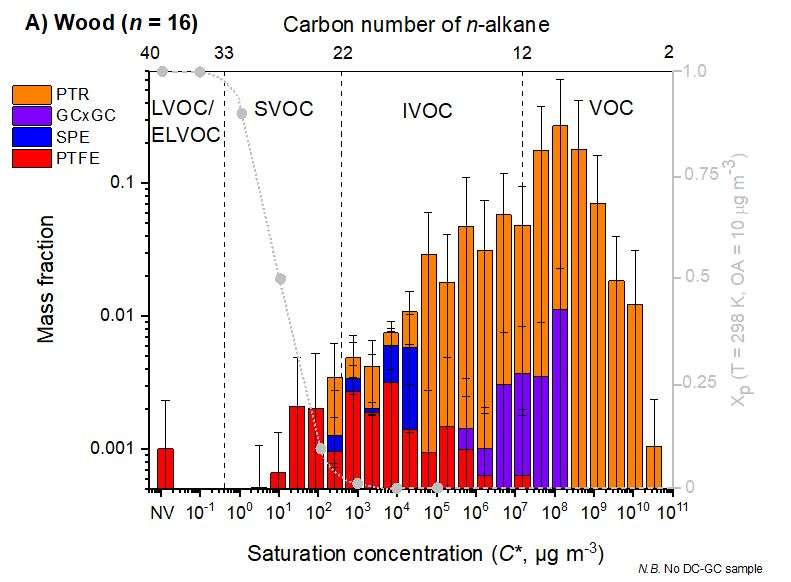
The burning of fuel wood releases organic components over a wide volatility range. Here the organic components emitted from the combustion of fuel wood are measured with a range of state-of-the art analytical techniques including proton-transfer-reaction time-of-flight mass spectrometry, two-dimensional gas chromatography and two-dimensional gas chromatography coupled to time-of-flight mass spectrometry.

Significant quantities of volatile organic compounds are released from the combustion of fuel wood. Large quantities of smaller oxygenate species are released during the combustion process, as well as organics formed from the depolymerisation reaction of lignin such as phenolics, furans and furanones. The combustion of fuel wood has also been shown to release many organic compounds into the aerosol phase. The burning of fuel woods has been shown to release organic components over a range of volatilities, over effective saturation concentrations, C*, from 10^{1}-10^{11} μg m^{−3}. The emissions from fuel wood samples collected from the Delhi area of India were shown to be 30 times more reactive with the hydroxyl radical than emissions from liquefied petroleum gas. Furthermore, when comparing 21 polycyclic aromatic hydrocarbons emitted from the same fuel wood samples from Delhi, emissions from fuel wood were around 20 times more toxic than emissions from liquefied petroleum gas.

In some of the most efficient burners, the temperature of the smoke is hot enough to burn itself (e.g. 609 °C (1,128 °F) for igniting carbon monoxide gas). This may significantly reduce smoke hazards while also providing additional heat from the process. By using a catalytic converter, the temperature for obtaining cleaner smoke can be reduced. Some U.S. jurisdictions prohibit sale or installation of stoves that do not incorporate catalytic converters.

==== Combustion by-product effects on human health ====
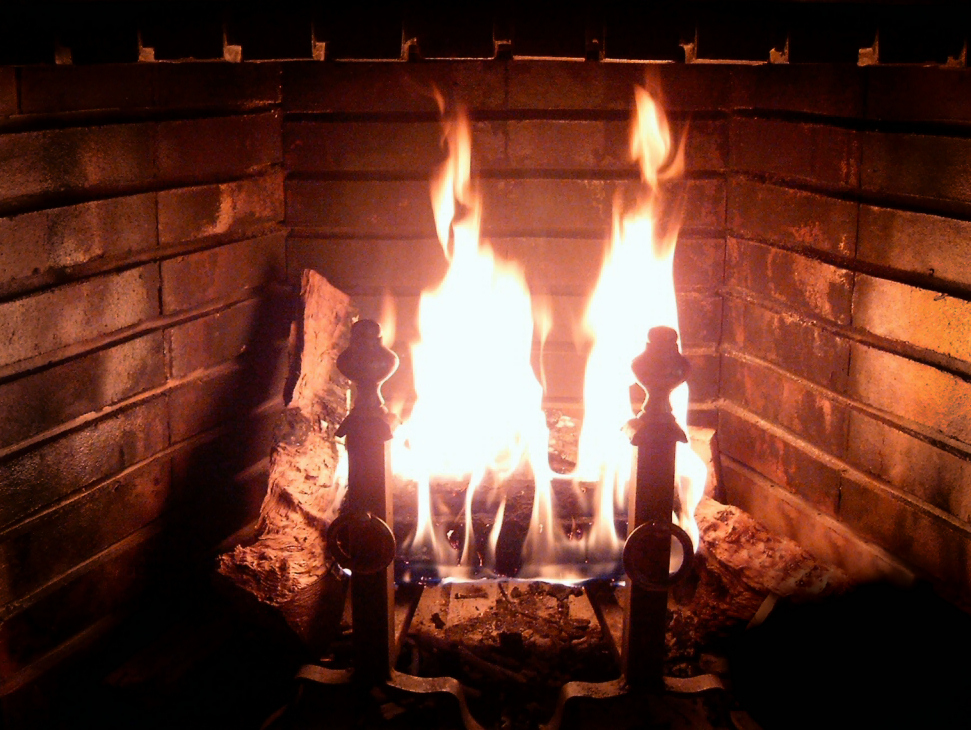
Wood-burning fireplace with burning log

Depending on population density, topography, climatic conditions and combustion equipment used, wood heating may substantially contribute to air pollution, particularly particulates. The conditions in which wood is burnt will greatly influence the content of the emission. Particulate air pollution can contribute to human health problems and increased hospital admissions for asthma & heart diseases.

The technique of compressing wood pulp into pellets or artificial logs can reduce emissions. The combustion is cleaner, and the increased wood density and reduced water content can eliminate some of the transport bulk. The fossil energy consumed in transport is reduced and represents a small fraction of the fossil fuel consumed in producing and distributing heating oil or gas.

=== Harvesting operations ===
Much wood fuel comes from native forests around the world. Plantation wood is rarely used for firewood, as it is more valuable as timber or wood pulp, however, some wood fuel is gathered from trees planted amongst crops, also known as agroforestry. The collection or harvesting of this wood can have serious environmental implications for the collection area. The concerns are often specific to the particular area, but can include all the problems that regular logging create. The heavy removal of wood from forests can cause habitat destruction and soil erosion. However, in many countries, for example in Europe and Canada, the forest residues are being collected and turned into useful wood fuels with minimal impact on the environment. Consideration is given to soil nutrition as well as erosion. The environmental impact of using wood as a fuel depends on how it is burnt. Higher temperatures result in more complete combustion and less noxious gases as a result of pyrolysis. Some may regard the burning of wood from a sustainable source as carbon-neutral. A tree, over the course of its lifetime, absorbs as much carbon (or carbon dioxide) as it releases when burnt.

Some firewood is harvested in "woodlots" managed for that purpose, but in heavily wooded areas it is more often harvested as a byproduct of natural forests. Deadfall that has not started to rot is preferred, since it is already partly seasoned. Standing dead timber is considered better still, as it is both seasoned, and has less rot. Harvesting this form of timber reduces the speed and intensity of bushfires. Harvesting timber for firewood is normally carried out by hand with chainsaws. Thus, longer pieces - requiring less manual labor, and less chainsaw fuel - are less expensive and only limited by the size of their firebox. Prices also vary considerably with the distance from wood lots, and quality of the wood. Firewood usually relates to timber or trees unsuitable for building or construction. Firewood is a renewable resource provided the consumption rate is controlled to sustainable levels. The shortage of suitable firewood in some places has seen local populations damaging huge tracts of bush possibly leading to further desertification.

=== Greenhouse gases ===
Wood burning creates more atmospheric CO_{2} than biodegradation of wood in a forest (in a given period) because by the time the bark of a dead tree has rotted, the log has already been occupied by other plants and micro-organisms which continue to sequester the CO_{2} by integrating the hydrocarbons of the wood into their life cycle. Wood harvesting and transport operations produce varying degrees of greenhouse gas pollution. Inefficient and incomplete combustion of wood can result in elevated levels of greenhouse gases other than CO_{2}, which may result in positive emissions where the byproducts have greater Carbon dioxide equivalent values.

In an attempt to provide quantitative information about the relative output of CO_{2} to produce electricity or domestic heating, the United Kingdom Department of Energy and Climate Change (DECC) has published a comprehensive model comparing the burning of wood (wood chip) and other fuels, based on 33 scenarios. The model's output is kilogram of CO_{2} produced per megawatt-hour (MWh) of delivered energy. Scenario 33 for example, which concerns the production of heat from wood chips produced from UK small roundwood produced from bringing neglected broadleaf forests back into production, shows that burning oil releases 377 kg (831 lb) of CO_{2} while burning woodchips releases 1,501 kg (3,309 lb) of CO_{2} per MWh of delivered energy. However, in scenario 32 of that same reference, which concerns the production of heat from wood chips that would otherwise be made into particleboard, showed that only 239 kg (527 lb) of CO_{2} per MWh was released. Therefore, the relative greenhouse effects of biomass energy production are dependent on the usage model.

The intentional and controlled charring of wood and its incorporation into the soil is an effective method for carbon sequestration as well as an important technique to improve soil conditions for agriculture, particularly in heavily forested regions. It forms the basis of the rich soils known as Terra preta.

=== Regulation and Legislation ===
The environmental impact of burning wood fuel is debatable. Several cities have moved towards setting standards of use and/or bans of wood burning fireplaces. For example, the city of Montréal, Québec passed a resolution to ban wood fireplace installation in new construction.

Wood burning advocates claim that properly harvested wood is carbon-neutral, therefore off-setting the negative impact of by-product particles given off during the burning process. In the context of forest wildfires, wood removed from the forest setting for use as wood fuel can reduce overall emissions by decreasing the quantity of open burned wood and the severity of the burn while combusting the remaining material under regulated conditions. On March 7, 2018, the United States House of Representatives passed a bill that would delay for three years the implementation of more stringent emission standards for new residential wood heaters.

== Potential use in renewable energy technologies ==
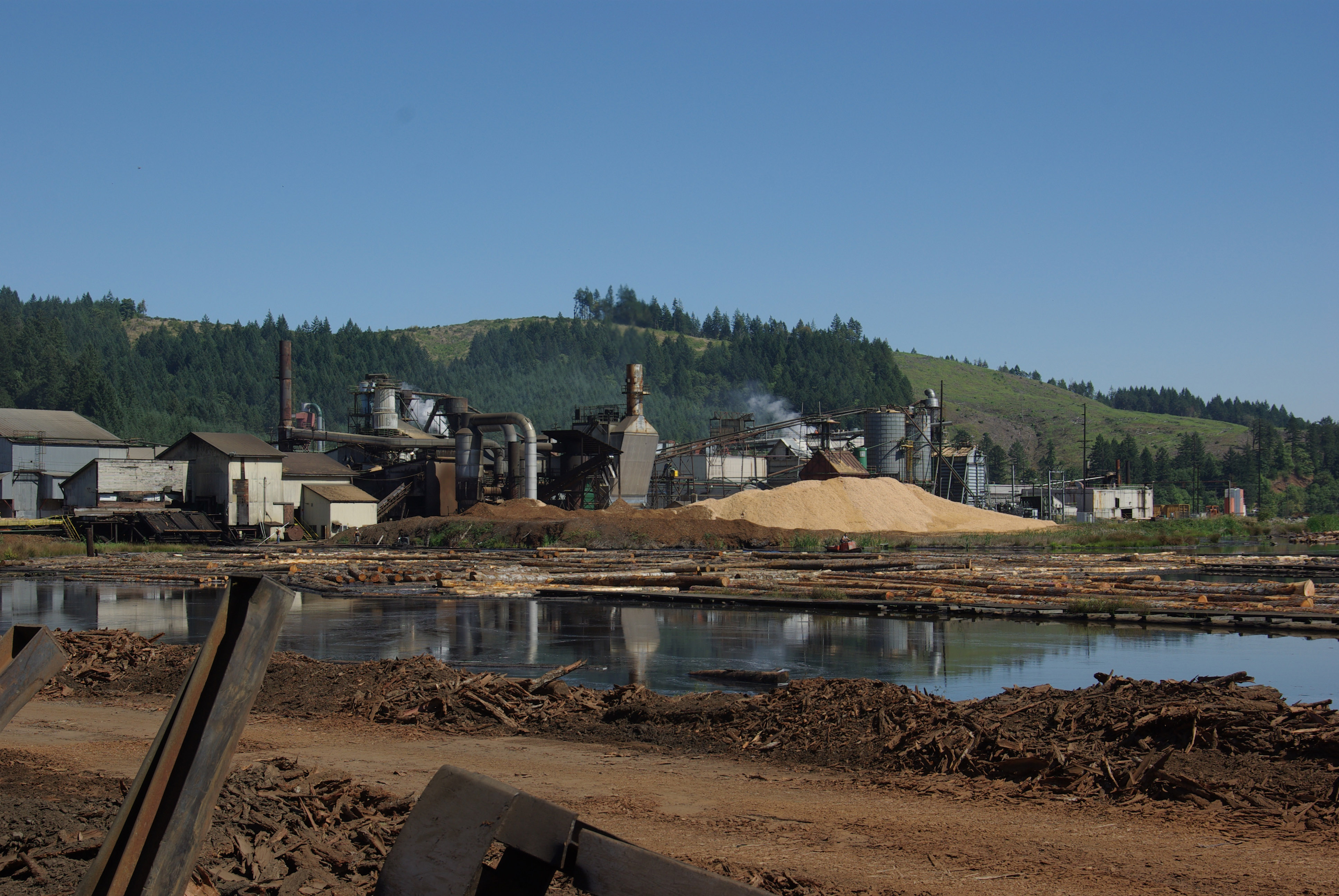
Sawmills create and burn sawdust: it can be pelletized and used at home.

- Efficient stove for developing nations
- Pellet stove
- Sawdust can be pelletized
- Wood pellets

== Usage ==
World production of roundwood by type, comparison of wood fuel to other types

Some European countries produce a significant fraction of their electricity needs from wood or wood wastes. In Scandinavian countries the cost of manual labor to process firewood is very high. Therefore, it is common to import firewood from countries with cheap labor and natural resources. The main exporters to Scandinavia are the Baltic countries (Estonia, Lithuania, and Latvia). In Finland, there is a growing interest in using wood waste as fuel for home and industrial heating, in the form of compacted pellets.

Many lower- and middle-income countries rely on wood for energy purposes (notably cooking). The largest producers are all in these income groups and have large populations with a high reliance on wood for energy: in 2021, India ranked first with 300 million m³ (15 percent of total production), followed by China with 156 million m3 and Brazil with 129 million m³ (8 percent and 7 percent of global production).

In the United States, wood fuel is the second-leading form of renewable energy (behind hydro-electric).

=== Australia ===
A pile of firewood logged from the Barmah Forest in Victoria

About 1.5 million households in Australia use firewood as the main form of domestic heating. As of 1995, approximately 1.85 million cubic metres of firewood (1m³ equals approximately one car trailer load) was used in Victoria annually, with half being consumed in Melbourne. This amount is comparable to the wood consumed by all of Victoria's sawlog and pulplog forestry operations (1.9 million m³).

Species used as sources of firewood include:

- Red gum, from forests along the Murray River (the Mid-Murray Forest Management Area, including the Barmah and Gunbower forests, provides about 80% of Victoria's red gum timber).
- Box and messmate stringybark, in southern Australia.
- Sugar gum, a wood with high thermal efficiency that usually comes from small plantations.
- Jarrah, in the Southwest of Western Australia. It generates a greater heat than most other available woods and is usually sold by the tonne.

=== Europe ===
In 2014, the construction of the biggest pellet plant in the Baltic region was started in Võrumaa, Sõmerpalu, Estonia, with an expected output of 110,000 tons of pellet / year. Different types of wood will be used in the process of pellet making (firewood, woodchips, shavings). The Warmeston OÜ plant started its activity by the end of 2014. In 2013, the main pellet consumers in Europe were the UK, Denmark, the Netherlands, Sweden, Germany and Belgium, as U.E.'s annual report on biofuels states. In Denmark and Sweden, pellets are used by power plants, households and medium scale consumers for district heating, compared to Austria and Italy, where pellets are mainly used as small - scale private residential and industrial boilers for heating. The UK is the single largest consuming market for industrial wood pellets, in large part due to its major biomass-fueled power stations such as Drax, MGT and Lynemouth.

=== Asia ===
Japan and South Korea are both growing markets for industrial wood pellets, and as of 2017, were expected to become the second and third largest global markets for wood pellets due to government policies favoring the use of biomass in power generation.

=== North America ===
Demand for wood fuel in the United States is principally driven by residential and commercial heating customers. Canada was not a major consumer of industrial wood pellets as of 2017, but has relatively aggressive de-carbonization policies and may become a significant consumer of industrial wood pellets by the 2020s.

== Sources ==
This article incorporates text from a free content work. Licensed under CC BY-SA IGO 3.0 (license statement/permission). Text taken from World Food and Agriculture – Statistical Yearbook 2023, FAO, FAO.

This article incorporates text from a free content work. Licensed under CC BY 4.0 (license statement/permission). Text taken from World Food and Agriculture – Statistical Yearbook 2025, Food and Agriculture Organization of the United Nations.

== See also ==
- Biofuel
- Biomass
- Forestry
- Outdoor wood furnace
- Renewable heat
- Woodchips
- Wood-fired oven
- Wood gas
