= Pellet heating =

Pellet heating is a heating system in which wood pellets (small pellets from wood chips and sawdust) are combusted. Other pelletized fuels such as straw pellets are used occasionally. Today's central heating system which run on wood pellets as a renewable energy source are comparable in operation and maintenance of oil and gas heating systems.

== Types ==
There are two different operating systems for pellet heating systems, one being single ovens with direct heat release into the living space and the other being central heating systems (pellet central heating systems) including control and feedback control systems.

=== Pellet stove ===
Pellet stoves or single ovens are generally plants in the power range of max. 6-8 kW and less. They are usually placed directly in the living room. They usually have a small reservoir of pellet fuel which can last for one or more days. Fuel supply and the control of combustion are controlled automatically and the ash removal is done manually. The heat is usually delivered directly into the room. The range of individual pellet stoves is similarly diverse as wood-burning stoves, including versions with viewings window which provide a view of the fire.

=== Pellet boilers ===
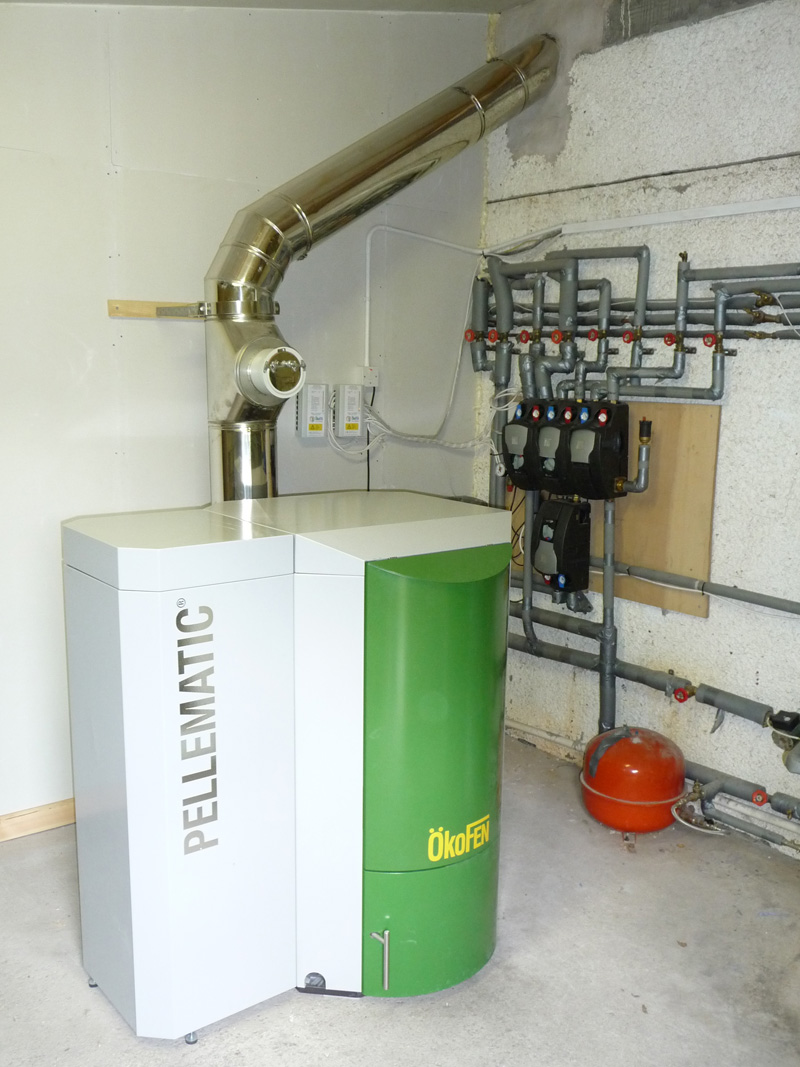
Pellet heating system standing in a cellar

Pellet boilers are used as central heating systems for heat requirements (heating load) of more than 3.9 kW (Kilowatt). But pellet central heating systems are not only used in single- or two-family homes (up to 30 kW), but also for larger residential or business units with heat requirements of a few hundred kW. Pellet burner systems run most efficiently at full load and can usually be regulated down to up to 30% of its full capacity. Since the warmup phase of pellet ovens usually takes longer than for oil or gas firing systems, short burning phases have negative effects on the fuel efficiency. In order to improve energy efficiency and reduce harmful emissions, pellet ovens are usually combined with buffer systems like water tanks, for example.

=== Add-on furnaces ===
Separate pellet burner, which can be mounted to an existing oil- or wood-fired boiler, are sometimes offered as an inexpensive alternative to a complete heating changeover. But the efficiency of these add-on furnaces is reduced. Usually add-on furnaces are not subsidized by government funds.

== Operation method ==
Similar to wood chip fuel heating systems also pellet fuel is delivered periodically and automatically from the pellet storage (for central heating systems) or the day tank (for pellet stove) according to need in the combustion chamber. With the heat generated from the heating circuit water is heated in the boiler of the pellet in pellet central heating systems. The heat distribution is the same as in other systems, which use water for heat distribution. Unlike for oil or gas heating systems, pellet heating systems demand the integration of a hot water tank in the heating system in order to reduce heat losses.

=== Burning unit ===
The furnace is automatically supplied with combustible material. The control technology of the system regulates the fuel input gradually in order to match the required heat output. Depending on the specific system, the supplied wood pellets are automatically ignited either with hot air blowers, or it uses a permanent ember bed in the combustion chamber.

Wood pellet heating systems work with different techniques of charging and combustion: Today there are specifically developed loading techniques for pellet combustion like drop chute firing, underfeed firing, side-fed firing or the use of a roller grate system. The method of charging and combustion of the pellet fuel is divided into 5 technologies.

- Drop shaft burner - Pellets slide down a drop chute into a burn pot. This way the combustion area is exactly defined, combustion can therefore be exactly controlled. With this technology the least rest ash remains compared with other systems and can be carried out of the burn pot by cleaning mechanisms. This type of charging is usually used for Pellet stoves.
- Roller grate system - The pellets fall from above onto several slow-turning steel plates with small clearances. A skimmer cleans the clearance spaces with every revolution so that the ash can fall down unhindered and combustion air can be fed through upwards.
- Underfeed burner - The pellets are pressed from below into a burn plate by an auger where they are burnt and the ash that remains falls over the edge of the plate into the ash pan below.
- Side-fed firing or retorte burner - This technology functions similarly to the underfeed firing except that the fuel is pressed via an auger onto the burn plate from the side. At the same time the burn plate as well as the air supply can be configured to match partial performances.
- Suction technology The 100% burnback security of the drop-chute system is combined with a solid metal rotary valve and prevents coating of the cyclone or suction turbine with dust. The narrow and high cyclone cleans the return air of dust and thereby guarantees maximum service life of the turbine. The variable control firebed possible with the drop principle, together with the high combustion chamber temperatures, makes modulation characteristics possible.

For more efficiency and less pollution in the air, modern pellet heating systems control combustion either via a temperature or flame space sensor in combination with an infinitely variable input of combustion air via a suck-blow fan or a lambda probe. The hot flue gases are led into the chimney via a heat exchanger with manual or automatic cleaning of the reheating surfaces.

=== Power range and efficiency ===
Pellet systems are available in different power ranges from about 3.9 Kilowatt single ovens between about 4 and 20 kW. Most systems available today have a power control over the fuel and combustion air supply, so that they can be operated at full load and at part load. Currently pellet boilers achieve a combustion efficiency of about 85-95% at full load (nominal thermal output) in thermal power operation.

With few exceptions, the efficiency decreases when the pellets boiler operates at partial load. The technical heating efficiencies described may vary greatly from the actual plant efficiencies, the reason the plant concept plays a major role. The use of a sufficiently large buffer storage is useful.

=== Storage and discharge ===
==== Day-reservoir ====
The wood pellets are stored in bulk in a tank or storage area and supplied to the burner by means of a conveyor system. The storage area must be dry, since the pellets react hygroscopically on clammy walls or high humidity during storage with crumbling.

Compared to oil, wood pellets require about three times the storage volume, though with less technical effort for the space, as pellets, unlike heating oil are not water-polluting substances. For storage, the pellets can be accommodated in a single storage space. The floor should be in the shape of a funnel usually made out of wood. At the end of the funnel is the inlet for the screw conveyor or the extraction pipe. More outlets in the storage room ensure unobstructed operation even in case of problems of one of the extraction points. Alternatives to a storage room are prefabricated tanks made of fabric or sheet steel. Buried underground tanks or free-standing silos can be used, if sufficient space is available in the building. In areas with high humidity it is important to use must tight tank systems to ensure the quality of pellet fuel.

==== Conveyance ====
To convey the pellets from the storage facility to the boiler room different systems are in use: Blower or screw systems can be used. The choice depends primarily on the distance from the storage to the boiler room. For distances greater than two meters flexible multi-stage screw conveyors are usually necessary. Blower systems can be used flexibly and feed distances up to 20 m. The discharge from the storage room or container is usually also supported by an inclined tank bottom or a hopper outlet.
