= Pellet fuel =

Solid fuel made from compressed organic material

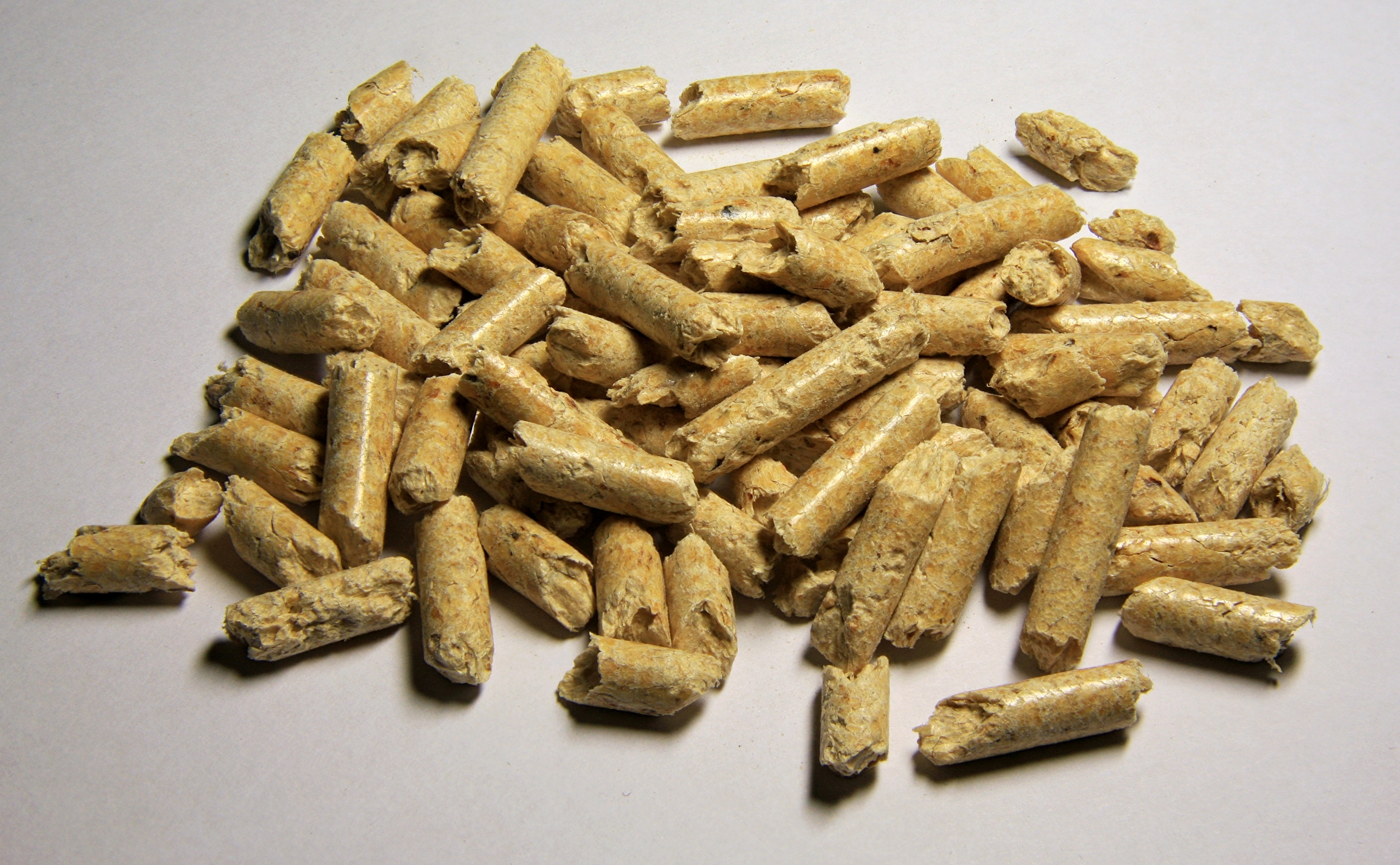
Wood pellets

Pellet fuels (or pellets) are a type of solid fuel made from compressed organic material. Pellets can be made from any one of five general categories of biomass: industrial waste and co-products, food waste, agricultural residues, energy crops, and untreated lumber.

Wood pellets are the most common type of pellet fuel and are generally made from compacted sawdust and related industrial wastes from the milling of lumber, manufacture of wood products and furniture, and construction. Other industrial waste sources include empty fruit bunches, palm kernel shells, coconut shells, and tree tops and branches discarded during logging operations. So-called "black pellets" are made of biomass, refined to resemble hard coal and were developed to be used in existing coal-fired power plants. Pellets are categorized by their heating value, moisture and ash content, and dimensions. They can be used as fuels for power generation, commercial or residential heating, and cooking.

Pellets are extremely dense and can be produced with a low moisture content, below 10%, that allows them to be burned with a very high combustion efficiency. Their regular geometry and small size allow automatic feeding with very fine calibration. They can be fed to a burner by auger feeding or by pneumatic conveying. Their high density permits compact storage and transport over long distance. They can be conveniently blown from a tanker to a storage bunker or silo on a customer's premises.

A broad range of pellet stoves, central heating furnaces, and other heating appliances have been developed and marketed since the mid-1980s. With the surge in the price of fossil fuels since 2005, the demand for pellet heating has increased in Europe and North America, and a sizable industry is emerging. According to the International Energy Agency Task 40, wood pellet production more than doubled between 2006 and 2010 to over 14 million tons. In a 2012 report, the Biomass Energy Resource Center says that it expected wood pellet production in North America to double again in the next five years.

Fuels for heating
- Heating oil
- Wood pellet
- Kerosene
- Propane
- Natural gas
- Wood
- Coal

== Production ==
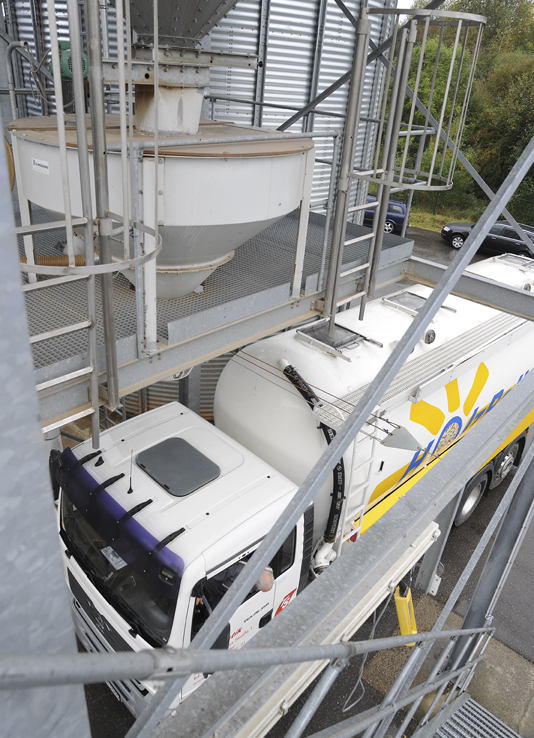
A pellet truck being filled at a plant in Germany.

Pellets are produced by compressing the wood material which has first passed through a hammer mill to provide a uniform dough-like mass. This mass is fed to a press, where it is squeezed through a die having holes of the size required, normally 6 mm diameter, sometimes 8 mm or larger. The high pressure of the press causes the temperature of the wood to increase greatly, and the lignin plasticizes slightly, forming a natural "glue" that holds the pellet together as it cools.

Pellets can be made from grass and other non-woody forms of biomass that do not contain lignin. A 2005 news story from Cornell University News suggested that grass pellet production was more advanced in Europe than North America. It suggested the benefits of grass as a feedstock included its short growing time (70 days), and ease of cultivation and processing. The story quoted Jerry Cherney, an agriculture professor at the school, stating that grasses produce 96% of the heat of wood and that "any mixture of grasses can be used, cut in mid- to late summer, left in the field to leach out minerals, then baled and pelleted. Drying of the hay is not required for pelleting, making the cost of processing less than with wood pelleting." In 2012, the Department of Agriculture of Nova Scotia announced as a demonstration project conversion of an oil-fired boiler to grass pellets at a research facility.

Rice-husk fuel-pellets are made by compacting rice-husk obtained as by-product of rice-growing from the fields. It also has similar characteristics to the wood-pellets and more environment-friendly, as the raw material is a waste-product. The energy content is about 4-4.2 kcal/kg and moisture content is typically less than 10%. The size of pellets is generally kept to be about 6 mm diameter and 25 mm length in the form of a cylinder; though larger cylinder or briquette forms are not uncommon. It is much cheaper than similar energy-pellets and can be compacted/manufactured from the husk at the farm itself, using cheap machinery. They generally are more environment-friendly as compared to wood-pellets. In the regions of the world where wheat is the predominant food-crop, wheat husk can also be compacted to produce energy-pellets, with characteristics similar to rice-husk pellets.

A report by CORRIM (Consortium On Research on Renewable Industrial Material) for the Life-Cycle Inventory of Wood Pellet Manufacturing and Utilization estimates the energy required to dry, pelletize and transport pellets is less than 11% of the energy content of the pellets if using pre-dried industrial wood waste. If the pellets are made directly from forest material, it takes up to 18% of the energy to dry the wood and additional 8% for transportation and manufacturing energy. An environmental impact assessment of exported wood pellets by the Department of Chemical and Mineral Engineering, University of Bologna, Italy and the Clean Energy Research Centre, at the University of British Columbia, published in 2009, concluded that the energy consumed to ship Canadian wood pellets from Vancouver to Stockholm (15,500 km via the Panama Canal), is about 14% of the total energy content of the wood pellets.

=== Pellet standards ===
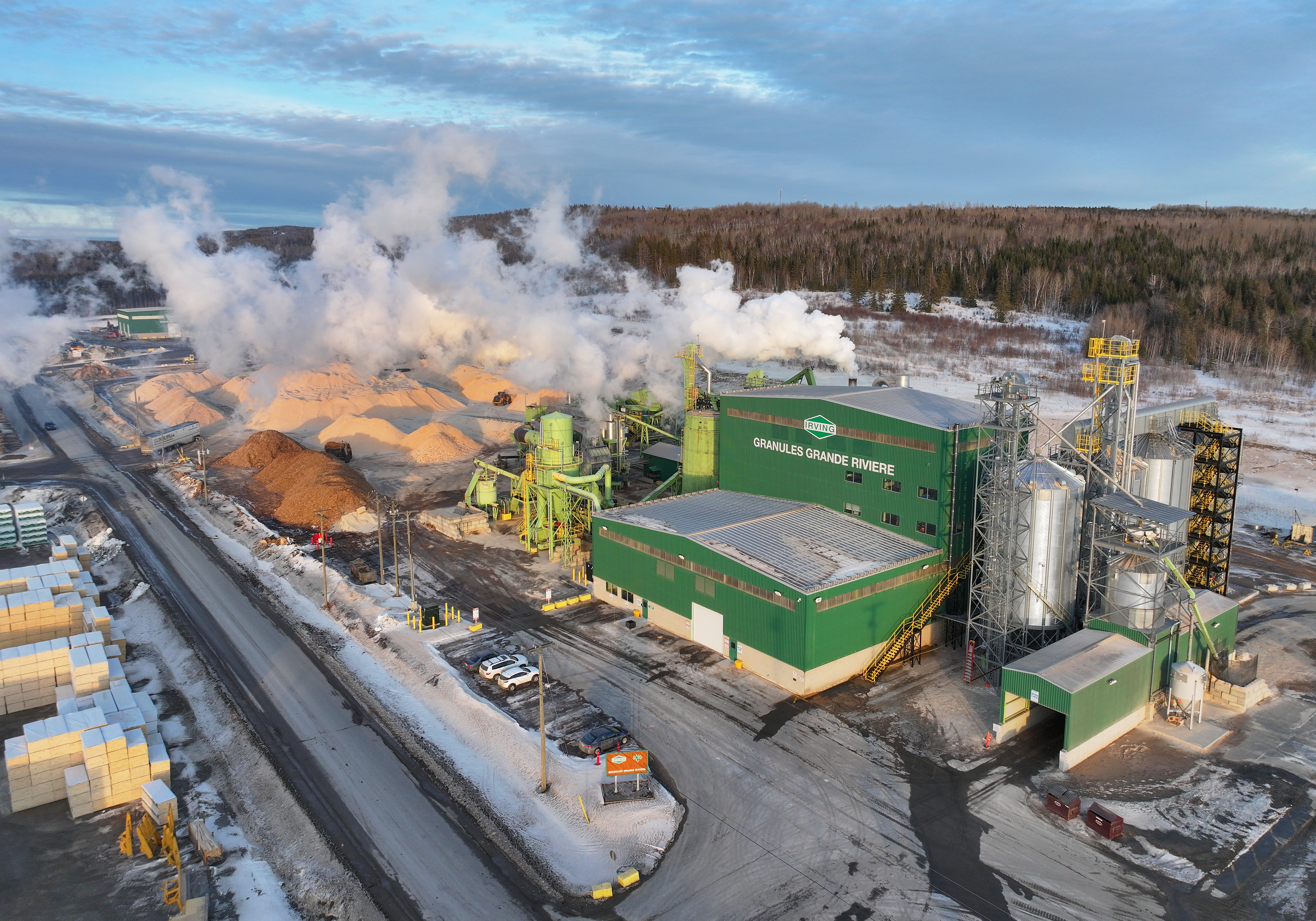
A pellet factory in St. Leonard, NB

Pellets conforming to the norms commonly used in Europe (DIN 51731 or Ö-Norm M-7135) have less than 10% water content, and are uniform in density, higher than 1 ton per cubic meter, thus they sink in water. (In contrast, the bulk density of a mass of pellets, including trapped air, is only about 0.6-0.7 ton per cubic meter). The pellets have good structural strength, and low dust and ash content. Because the wood fibres are broken down by the hammer mill, there is virtually no difference in the finished pellets between different wood types. Pellets can be made from nearly any wood variety; provided the pellet press is equipped with good instrumentation, the differences in feed material can be compensated for in the press regulation. In Europe, the main production areas are south Scandinavia, Finland, Central Europe, Austria, and the Baltic countries.

Pellets conforming to the European standards norms which contain recycled wood or outside contaminants are considered Class B pellets. Recycled materials such as particle board, treated or painted wood, melamine resin-coated panels and the like are particularly unsuitable for use in pellets, since they may produce noxious emissions and uncontrolled variations in the burning characteristics of the pellets.

Standards used in the United States are different, developed by the Pellet Fuels Institute and, as in Europe, are not mandatory. Still, many manufacturers comply, as warranties of US-manufactured or imported combustion equipment may not cover damage by pellets non-conformant with regulations. Prices for US pellets surged during the fossil fuel price inflation of 2007–2008, but later dropped markedly and are generally lower on a price per energy amount basis than most fossil fuels, excluding coal.

Regulatory agencies in Europe and North America are in the process of tightening the emissions standards for all forms of wood heat, including wood pellets and pellet stoves. These standards will become mandatory, with independently certified testing to ensure compliance. In the United States, the new rules initiated in 2009 have completed the EPA regulatory review process, with final new rules issued for comment on June 24, 2014. The American Lumber Standard Committee will be the independent certification agency for the new pellet standards.

== Hazards ==
Wood pellets can emit large quantities of poisonous carbon monoxide during storage by autoxidation. Fatal accidents have taken place in private storerooms and onboard marine vessels.

When handled, wood pellets give off fine dust which can cause serious dust explosions.

Wood pellets are typically stored in bulk in large silos. Pellets may self-heat, ignite and give rise to a deep-seated smoldering fire that is very difficult to extinguish. The smoldering fire produces toxic carbon monoxide and flammable pyrolysis gases that can lead to silo explosions.

== Pellet stove operation ==
There are three general types of pellet heating appliances: free standing pellet stoves, pellet stove inserts and pellet boilers.

Pellet stoves work like modern furnaces, where fuel, wood, or other biomass pellets, is stored in a storage bin called a hopper. The hopper can be located on the top of the appliance, the side of it or remotely. A mechanical auger automatically feeds pellets into a burn pot. From there, they burn at high temperatures with minimal emissions. Heat-exchange tubes send air heated by fire into room. Convection fans circulate air through heat-exchange tubes and into room. Pellet stoves have circuit boards inside that act like a thermostat and to regulate temperature.

A pellet stove insert is a stove that is inserted into an existing masonry or prefabricated wood fireplace, similar to a fireplace insert.

Pellet boilers are standalone central heating and hot water systems designed to replace traditional fossil fuel systems in residential, commercial and institutional applications. Automatic or auto-pellet boilers include silos for bulk storage of pellets, a fuel delivery system that moves the fuel from the silo to the hopper, a logic controller to regulate temperature across multiple heating zones and an automated ash removal system for long-term automated operations.

Pellet baskets allow one to heat one's home using pellets in existing stoves or fireplaces.

== Energy output and efficiency ==
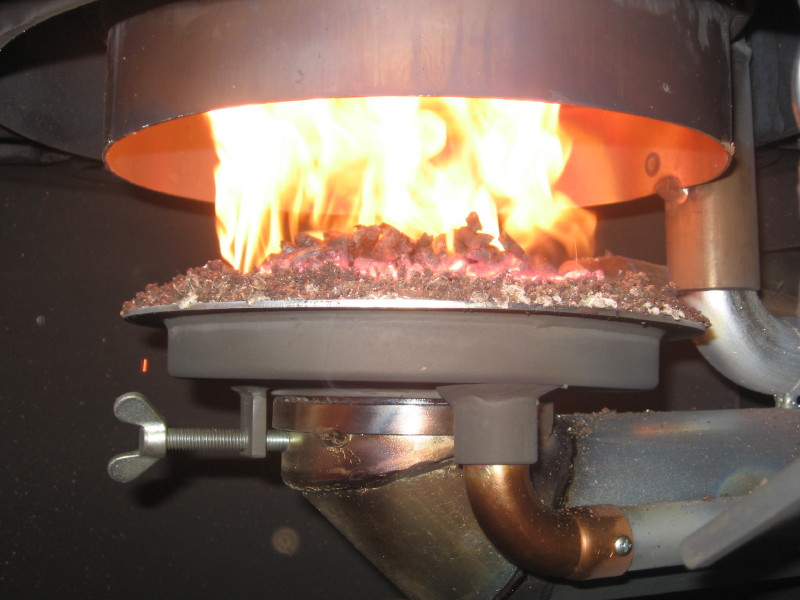
Wood-pellet heater

The energy content of wood pellets is approximately 4.7 – 5.2 MWh/tonne (~7450 BTU/lb), 14.4-20.3 MJ/kg.

High-efficiency wood pellet stoves and boilers have been developed in recent years, typically offering combustion efficiencies of over 85%. The newest generation of wood pellet boilers can work in condensing mode and therefore achieve 12% higher efficiency values.

Wood pellet boilers have limited control over the rate and presence of combustion compared to liquid or gaseous-fired systems. For this reason, they are better suited for hydronic heating systems due to the hydronic system's greater ability to store heat. Pellet burners capable of being retrofitted to oil-burning boilers are also available.

== Air pollution emissions ==
Emissions such as NO_{x}, SO_{x} and volatile organic compounds from pellet burning equipment are in general very low in comparison to other forms of combustion heating. A recognized problem is the emission of fine particulate matter to the air, especially in urban areas that have a high concentration of pellet heating systems or coal or oil heating systems in close proximity. This PM_{2.5} emissions of older pellet stoves and boilers can be problematic in close quarters, especially in comparison to natural gas (or renewable biogas), though on large installations electrostatic precipitators, cyclonic separators, or baghouse particle filters can control particulates when properly maintained and operated.

== Climate change aspects ==
There is uncertainty to what degree making heat or electricity by burning wood pellets contributes to global climate change, as well as how the impact on climate compares to the impact of using competing sources of heat. Factors in the uncertainty include the wood source, carbon dioxide emissions from production and transport as well as from final combustion, and what time scale is appropriate for the consideration.

A report in 2010 concluded that burning biomass such as wood pellets or wood chips releases a large amount of CO_{2} into the air, creating a "carbon debt" that is not retired for 20–25 years and after which there is a net benefit. Others have disputed this conclusions, and scientists have pointed out oversights in the report, suggesting that climate impacts are worse than reported.

Until around 2008 it was commonly assumed, even in scientific papers, that biomass energy (including from wood pellets) is carbon neutral, largely because regrowth of vegetation was believed to recapture and store the carbon that is emitted to the air. Then, scientific papers studying the climate implications of biomass began to appear which refuted the simplistic assumption of its carbon neutrality. According to the Biomass Energy Resource Center, the assumption of carbon neutrality "has shifted to a recognition that the carbon implications of biomass depend on how the fuel is harvested, from what forest types, what kinds of forest management are applied, and how biomass is used over time and across the landscape."

The climate impact of bioenergy varies considerably depending on where biomass feedstocks come from and how they are grown. For example, burning wood for energy releases carbon dioxide; those emissions can be significantly offset if the trees that were harvested are replaced by new trees in a well-managed forest, as the new trees will absorb carbon dioxide from the air as they grow. However, the establishment and cultivation of bioenergy crops can displace natural ecosystems, degrade soils, and consume water resources and synthetic fertilisers.

Approximately one-third of all wood used for traditional heating and cooking in tropical areas is harvested unsustainably. Bioenergy feedstocks typically require significant amounts of energy to harvest, dry, and transport; the energy usage for these processes may emit greenhouse gases. In some cases, the impacts of land-use change, cultivation, and processing can result in higher overall carbon emissions for bioenergy compared to using fossil fuels.

== Sustainability ==
The wood products industry is concerned that if large-scale use of wood energy is instituted, the supply of raw materials for construction and manufacturing (lumber) will be significantly curtailed.

== Cost ==
Due to the rapid increase in popularity since 2005, pellet availability and cost may be an issue. This is an important consideration when buying a pellet stove, furnace, pellet baskets or other devices known in the industry as Bradley Burners. However, current pellet production is increasing and there are plans to bring several new pellet mills online in the US in 2008–2009.

The cost of the pellets can be affected by the building cycle leading to fluctuations in the supply of sawdust and offcuts.

Per the New Hampshire Office of Energy and Planning release on Fuel Prices updated on 5 Oct 2015, the cost of #2 fuel oil delivered can be compared to the cost of Bulk Delivered Wood Fuel Pellets using their BTU equivalent: 1 ton pellets = 118.97 gallon of #2 Fuel Oil. This assumes that one ton of pellets produces 16,500,000 BTU and one gallon of #2 Fuel Oil produces 138,690 BTU. Thus if #2 Fuel Oil delivered costs $1.90/Gal, the breakeven price for pellets is $238.00/Ton delivered.

== Usage by region ==
=== Europe ===
EU pellet use (tons) in 2023-2024
Country	Amount
UK	9 800 000
Italy	2 600 000
Denmark	1 800 000
Netherlands	1 800 000
Sweden	2 600 000
Germany	3 400 000
France	2 000 000
Austria	1 330 000

Usage across Europe varies due to government regulations. In the Netherlands, Belgium, and the UK, pellets are used mainly in large-scale power plants. The UK's largest power plant, the Drax power station, converted some of its units to pellet burners starting in 2012; by 2015 Drax had made the UK the largest recipient of exports of wood pellets from the US. In Denmark and Sweden, pellets are used in large-scale power plants, medium-scale district heating systems, and small-scale residential heat. In Germany, Austria, Italy, and France, pellets are used mostly for small-scale residential and industrial heat.

The UK has initiated a grant scheme called the Renewable Heat Incentive (RHI) allowing non-domestic and domestic wood pellet boiler installations to receive payments over a period of between 7 and 20 years. It is the first such scheme in the world and aims to increase the amount of renewable energy generated in the UK, in line with EU commitments. Scotland and Northern Ireland have separate but similar schemes. From Spring 2015, any biomass owners—whether domestic or commercial—must buy their fuels from BSL (Biomass Suppliers List) approved suppliers in order to receive RHI payments. The Renewable Heat Incentive scandal also referred to as the "cash for ash scandal", was a political scandal in Northern Ireland that centred on a failed renewable energy (wood pellet burning) incentive scheme.

Pellets are widely used in Sweden, the main pellet producer in Europe, mainly as an alternative to oil-fired central heating. In Austria, the leading market for pellet central heating furnaces (relative to its population), it is estimated that 2/3 of all new domestic heating furnaces are pellet burners. In Italy, a large market for automatically fed pellet stoves has developed. Italy's main usage for pellets is small-scale private residential and industrial boilers for heating.

In 2014 in Germany, the overall wood pellet consumption per year comprised 2,2 million tonnes. These pellets are consumed predominantly by residential small-scale heating sector. The co-firing plants which use pellet sector for energy production are not widespread in the country. The largest amount of wood pellets is certified with DINplus, and these are the pellets of the highest quality. As a rule, the pellets of lower quality are exported.

As early as 1997 a fully automatic wood pellet boilers with similar comfort level as oil and gas boilers became available in Austria.

=== India ===
In 2019, India started co-firing biomass pellets in coal-fired power stations around its capital city Delhi to reduce the air pollution caused by the stubble/biomass burning in open fields to clear the fields for sowing the next crop. Plans are made to use biomass pellets for power generation throughout the country to utilize nearly 145 million tonnes of agricultural residue to replace equal quantity of imported coal in power generation.

=== New Zealand ===
The total sales of wood pellets in New Zealand was 300,000–500,000 tonnes in 2013. Recent construction of new wood pellet plants has given a huge increase in production capacity. Nature's Flame wood pellet processing plant, in Taupo, is due in late 2019 to double its annual production capacity to 85,000 tonnes. Azwood Energy operates a wood pellet processing plant in Nelson, utilising more than 1.2 million cubic metres of forestry residue each year to provide carbon neutral fuel for domestic use, hospitals, schools and industrial processes, including milk-processing.

In 2025, the thermal electricity plant at Huntly is looking for a supply of black pellets.

=== United States ===
Some companies import European-made boilers. As of 2009, about 800,000 Americans were using wood pellets for heat. It was estimated that 2.33 million tons of wood pellets would be used for heat in the US in 2013. The US wood pellet export to Europe grew from 1.24 million tons in 2006 to 7 million tons in 2012, but forests grew even more.

== Other uses ==
=== Horse bedding ===
When small amounts of water are added to wood pellets, they expand and revert to sawdust. This makes them suitable to use as a horse bedding. The ease of storage and transportation are additional benefits over traditional bedding. However, some species of wood, including walnut, can be toxic to horses and should never be used for bedding.

In Thailand, rice husk pellets are being produced for animal bedding. They have a high absorption rate which makes them ideal for the purpose.

=== Cattle fodder ===
The biomass pellets made from edible matter can also be used as cattle fodder by importing from far away fodder surplus places to overcome the fodder shortage.

=== Absorbents ===
Wood pellets are also used to absorb contaminated water when drilling oil or gas wells.

== See also ==
- Biochar
- Biomass briquettes
- Firelog
- Pellet mill
- Renewable heat
- Solid fuel
- Woodchips

== Sources ==
- IPCC (2014). Edenhofer, O.; Pichs-Madruga, R.; Sokona, Y.; Farahani, E.; et al. (eds.). Climate Change 2014: Mitigation of Climate Change: Working Group III contribution to the Fifth Assessment Report of the Intergovernmental Panel on Climate Change. Cambridge University Press. ISBN 978-1-107-05821-7. OCLC 892580682. Archived from the original on 26 January 2017.
- Smil, Vaclav (2017a). Energy Transitions: Global and National Perspectives. Praeger Publishing. ISBN 978-1-4408-5324-1. OCLC 955778608.
- Tester, Jefferson W.; Drake, Elisabeth M.; Driscoll, Michael J.; Golay, Michael W.; Peters, William A. (2012). Sustainable Energy: Choosing Among Options. MIT Press. ISBN 978-0-262-01747-3. OCLC 892554374.
- World Health Organization (2016). Burning Opportunity: Clean Household Energy for Health, Sustainable Development, and Wellbeing of Women and Children (PDF). ISBN 978-92-4-156523-3. Archived (PDF) from the original on 13 June 2021.
