= Fireplace insert =

Device for heating mounted in an open stove to increase efficiency

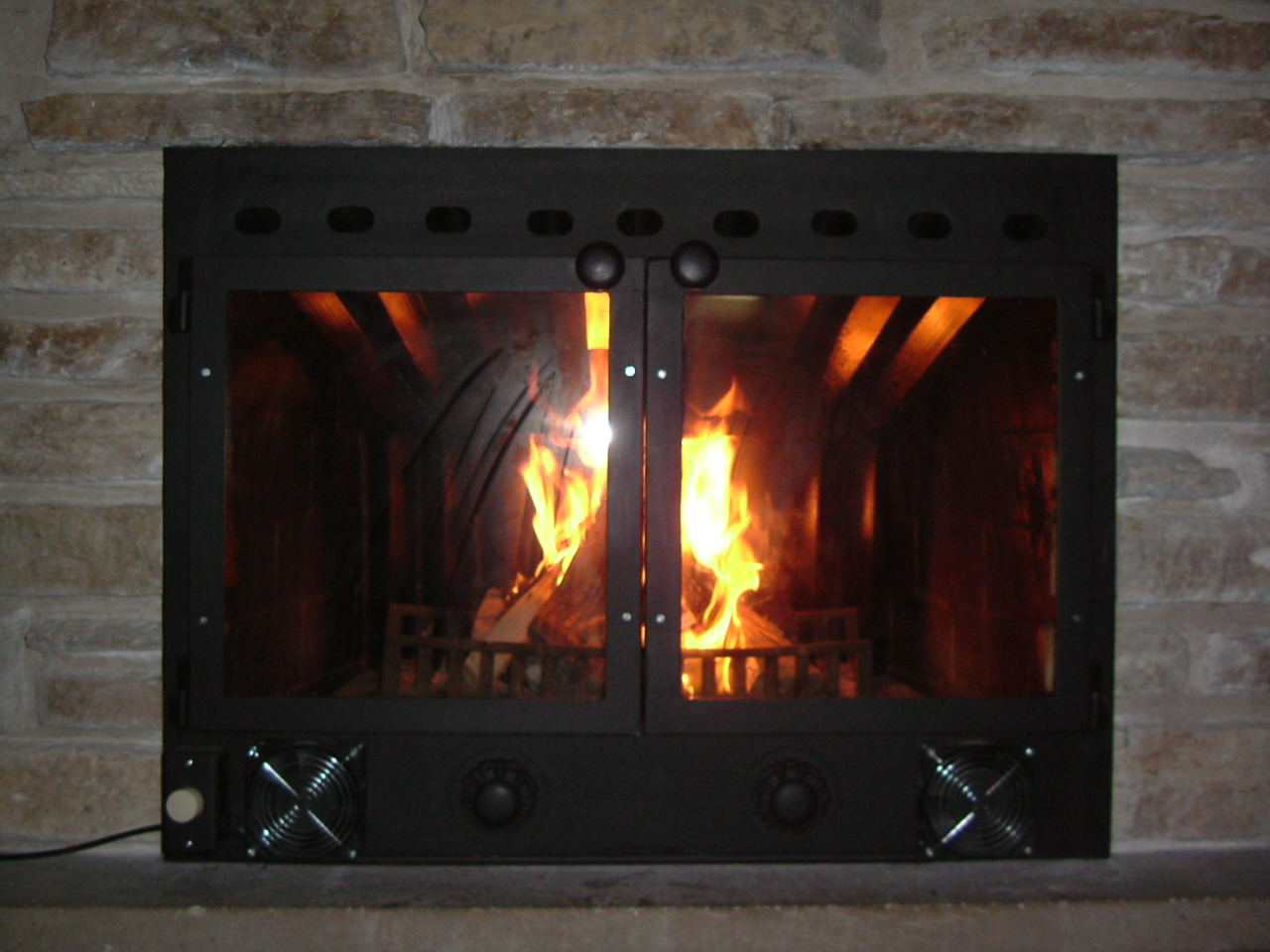
This custom-fitted fireplace insert has large glass doors to maximize the view of the fireplace, and a large surface area heat exchange with thermostat-controlled fan-forced air.

A fireplace insert is a device that can be inserted into an existing masonry or prefabricated wood fireplace. Fireplace inserts can be fuelled by gas, wood, electricity, coal, or wood pellet. Most fireplace inserts are made from cast iron or steel. Fresh air enters through vents below the insert, where it then circulates around the main chamber and back into the room. Separate adjustable air vents control airflow into the firebox which then exits through a chimney. Typical fireplace inserts have insulated glass doors that allow the fire to be viewed while closed, improving its heat output and fuel efficiency while maintaining ambiance of a traditional fireplace. Air is directed across the interior surface of the glass to prevent a build-up of ash.

Wood burning fireplaces are ineffective in heating a home as more than 90% of the heated air is pulled up the chimney. Using an EPA certified fireplace insert can improve heating efficiency by up to 50% while using less wood fuel, reduce creosote build-up in the chimney and lower smoke pollution inside and outside the home.

Fireplace inserts are categorized primarily by the type of fuel used (natural gas, propane, EPA-certified wood heaters, pellet, coal or electric).

== History ==
The fireplace insert was invented in 1742 by Benjamin Franklin, which he called 'The Pennsylvania Fireplace' (also known as the Franklin Stove), in the United States. He came upon the idea as a means of using coke (a smokeless fuel made by the destructive distillation of certain types of coal) and incorporated the use of an electric blower to improve efficiency.

The fireplace insert was improved upon by David Rittenhouse who added a pipe bent at 90 degrees to the back of the stove which was meant to direct the smoke out of a chimney.

In 1796, Sir Benjamin Thompson, also known as Count Rumford, introduced a revolutionary fireplace design that influenced fireplaces well into the 1900s. His model featured a taller, narrower structure with a smaller, shallower firebox and sharply angled coverings on either side. The narrow throat of his design efficiently dispersed smoke and air.

In the 1980s, electric fireplace inserts became more popular thanks to technological advancements. These offered a convenient way to add warmth and style to a room.

Today, there is a wide variety of fireplaces and fuels, including wood and natural gas. In the United States, fireplaces are often present primarily for aesthetic purposes.

== Electric fireplace inserts ==
Electric fireplace inserts are made to fit any size of a brick or steel-covered hearth. Plug-in electric fireplace inserts typically connect to a common 120-volt wall plug and are placed within an existing fireplace.

Electric fireplace inserts come in three form factors:

- Electric log inserts (which imitate a natural wood flame)
- Plug-in inserts
- Built-in units

== See also ==
- Franklin stove
- History of thermodynamics
- Stove
- Wood-burning stove
