= Consortium for Research on Renewable Industrial Materials =

Non-profit environmentalist research organization

Coordinates: 47.651745°N 122.307546°W

- Abbreviation: CORRIM
- Website: http://www.corrim.org/

The Consortium for Research on Renewable Industrial Materials (CORRIM) is a non-profit organization dedicated to developing life-cycle assessment (LCA) data related to wood-based materials and energy, and their alternatives.

== Research results ==
In general, the data generated through CORRIM research provide evidence for the favorable environmental impact profile of wood products. Complete CORRIM reports are available from its website, and have been published by the Society of Wood Science and Technology (SWST) in its journal. The life cycle inventory (LCI) data developed by CORRIM are also available to the public from the US LCI Database Project.
