= Pellet mill =

Machine that makes pellets

A pellet mill, also known as a pellet press, is a type of mill or machine press used to create pellets from powdered material. Pellet mills are unlike grinding mills, in that they combine small materials into a larger, homogeneous mass, rather than break large materials into smaller pieces.

== Types ==
There are many types of pellet mills that can be generally grouped into large-scale and small-scale types. According to the production capacity, pellet mills also can be divided into flat die pellet mill and ring die pellet mill.

=== Large-scale ===
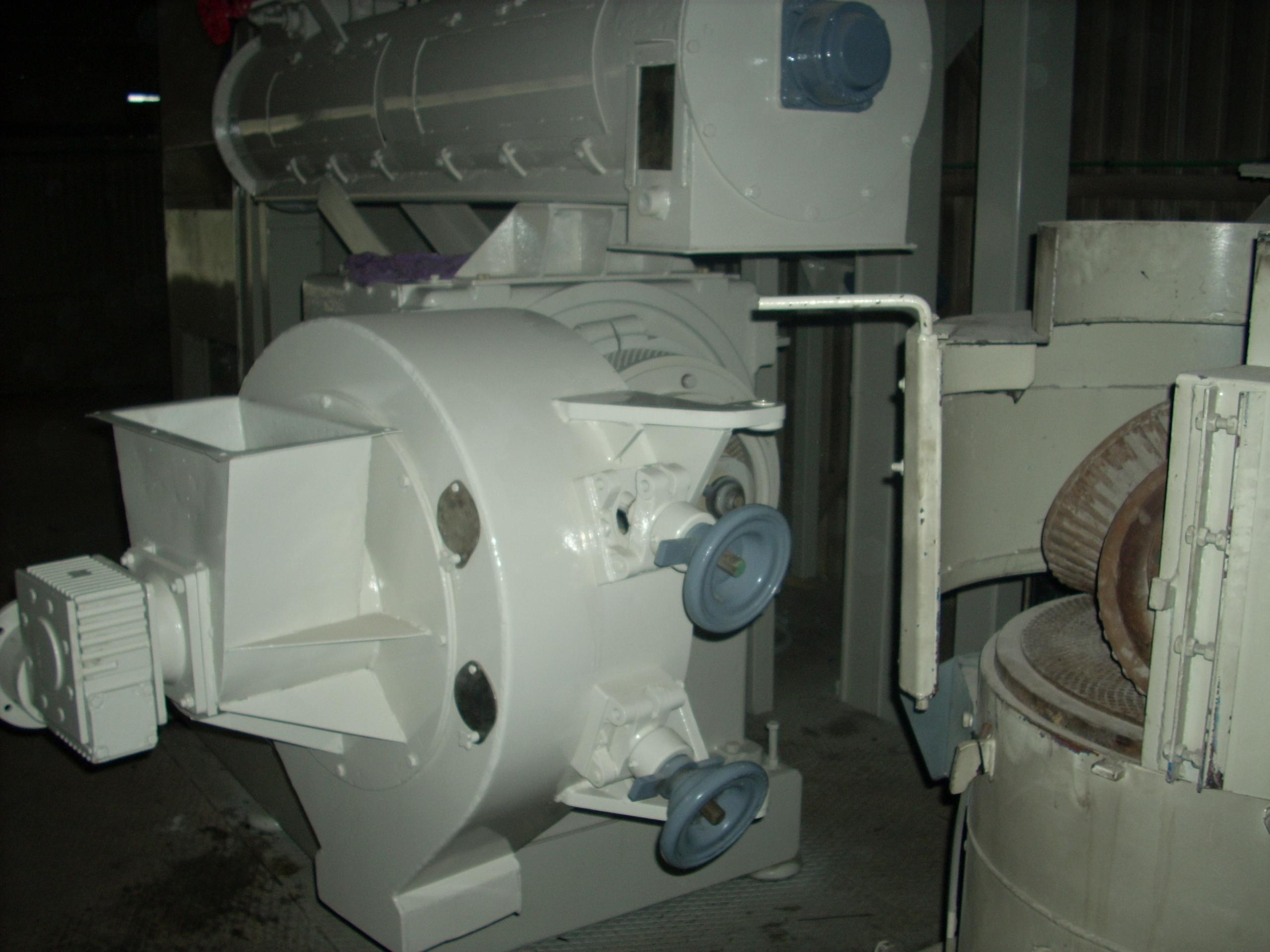
Pellet mills

There are two common types of large-scale pellet mills: flat die mills and ring die mills. Flat die mills use a flat die with slots. The powder is introduced to the top of the die and as the die rotates a roller presses the powder through the holes in the die. A cutter on the other side of the die cuts the exposed pellet free from the die. In the ring die there are radial slot throughout the die. Powder is fed into the inside of the die and spreaders evenly distribute the powder. Two rollers then compress the powder through the die holes. Two cutters are used to cut the pellets free from the outside of the die.

Large scale pellet mills are usually used to produce animal feed, wood pellets, and fuel pellets for use in a pellet stove.

=== Small-scale ===
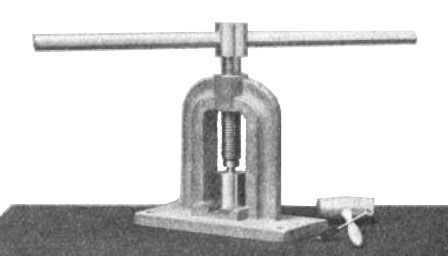
A screw-type pellet mill

Small-scale mills are usually variations of screw presses or hydraulic presses. The same basic process is used for both types. A die, also known as a mold, holds the uncompressed powder in a shaped pocket. The pocket shape defined the final pellet shape. A platen is attached to the end of the screw (in a screw press) or the ram (in a hydraulic press) which compresses the powder.

Some platens are heated to speed up the time it takes and improve the overall structure of the pellet. They may also have water ports for quick cooling between uses.

== Applications ==
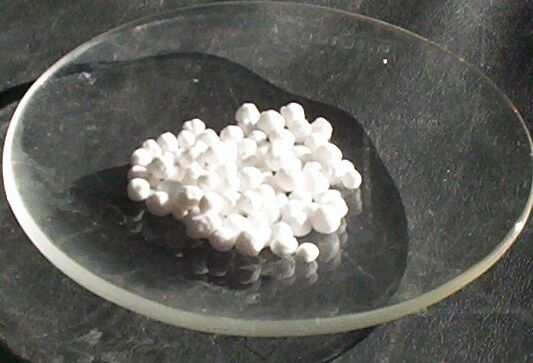
KBr pellets

One of the more common applications is to produce KBr (potassium bromide) pellets which are used in infrared spectroscopy applications.

Animal feed pellets are usually a mixture of dry powdered feedstock, such as flour, sawdust, or grass, and a wet ingredient, such as molasses or steam. Feedstocks for pellet mills can sometimes break down and then re-form, or polymerize, under the extreme heat and pressure of the pellet mill.
