= Pellet stove =

Stove that uses pellet fuel

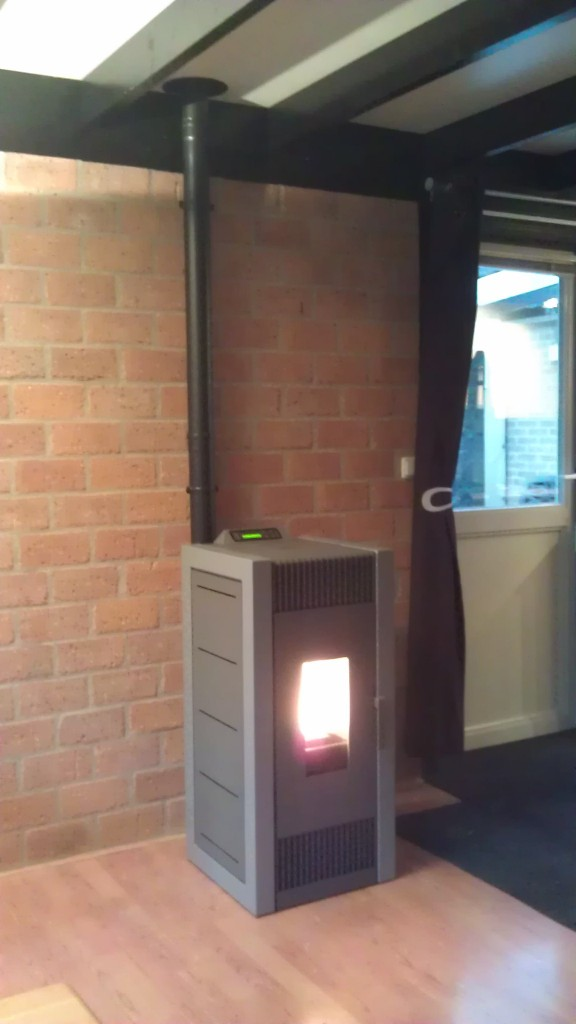
A modern pellet stove

A pellet stove is a stove that burns compressed wood or biomass pellets to create a source of heat for residential and sometimes industrial spaces. By steadily feeding fuel from a storage container (hopper) into a burn pot area, it produces a constant flame that requires little to no physical adjustments. Today's central heating systems operated with wood pellets as a renewable energy source can reach an efficiency factor of more than 90%.

== Background and history ==
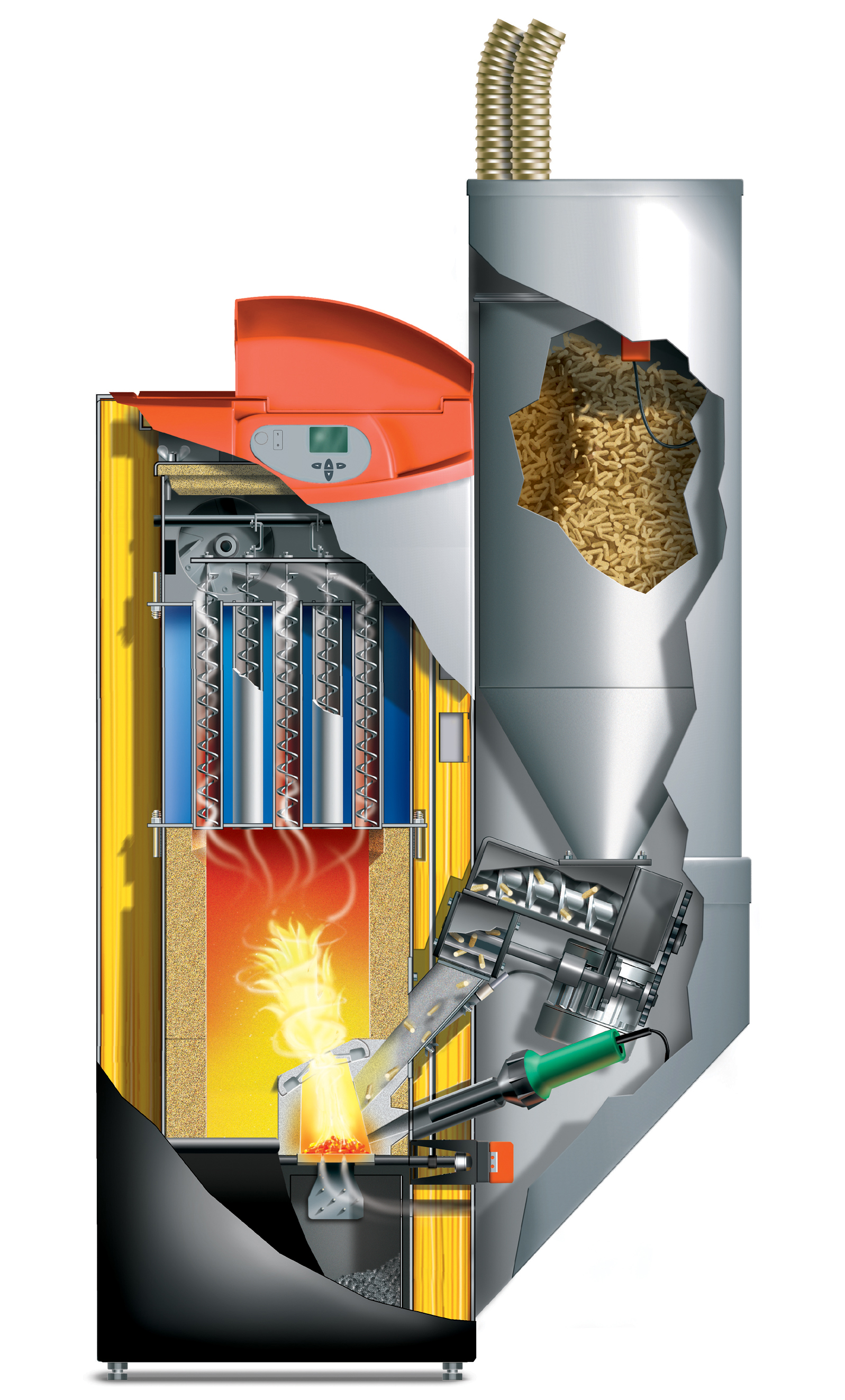
Modern pellet stove cross section

Scrap wood and ship-lap burners have been around since at least the early 20th century easily seen in the use of barrel stoves, braziers, and oil drum fires in depression-era Hooverville historical media. Professionally built wood-fired ovens with sawdust hoppers were used in the early part of the 20th century. All of these units used scrap wood or sawdust. In 1930, the Presto-Log was invented reusing scrap sawdust from the Potlatch pine mill in Lewiston, Idaho for domestic heat. From this came the miniaturized pellet stove, which emerged from Washington State in the 1980s.

The pellet stove changed in appearance over the years from a simple, boxy workhorse design, to a modern heating appliance. Pellet stoves can be either free-standing units or fireplace inserts vented into an existing chimney. Most pellet stoves are constructed using large, heat-conductive, steel or cast-iron pieces, with stainless steel to encase circuitry and exhaust areas.

Pellet furnaces and pellet boilers are also available in addition to the decorative stove. These units can be retrofitted into existing home heating systems with only minor changes to existing ductwork and or plumbing.

The heating industry has considerably shifted toward biomass stoves and heating devices based on efficient combustible and renewable resources. This was a trend that began with the 1973 oil crisis causing the creation of the first pellet stoves. Even so, pellet stoves have become a viable, economical, and popular option for home heating systems only in the last ten years. Between 1998 and 2010, 824,410 pellet stoves and fireplace inserts were made in the U.S.

While some stoves are UL-listed for fuels other than pellets, such as wheat, corn, sunflower seeds, and cherry pits, many pellet stove manufacturers recommend the use of a corn and pellet mixture.

== Method ==
The pellet fuel is delivered from the storage facility or the day tank (single stoves) into the combustion chamber. With the heat generated, circuit water is heated in the pellet boiler. In central heating systems the hot water then runs through the heating circuit. The heat distribution is the same as other central heating systems. Unlike oil or gas heating, the inclusion of a hot water reservoir is recommended with pellet heating systems to save hot water until it is needed.

== Benefits ==
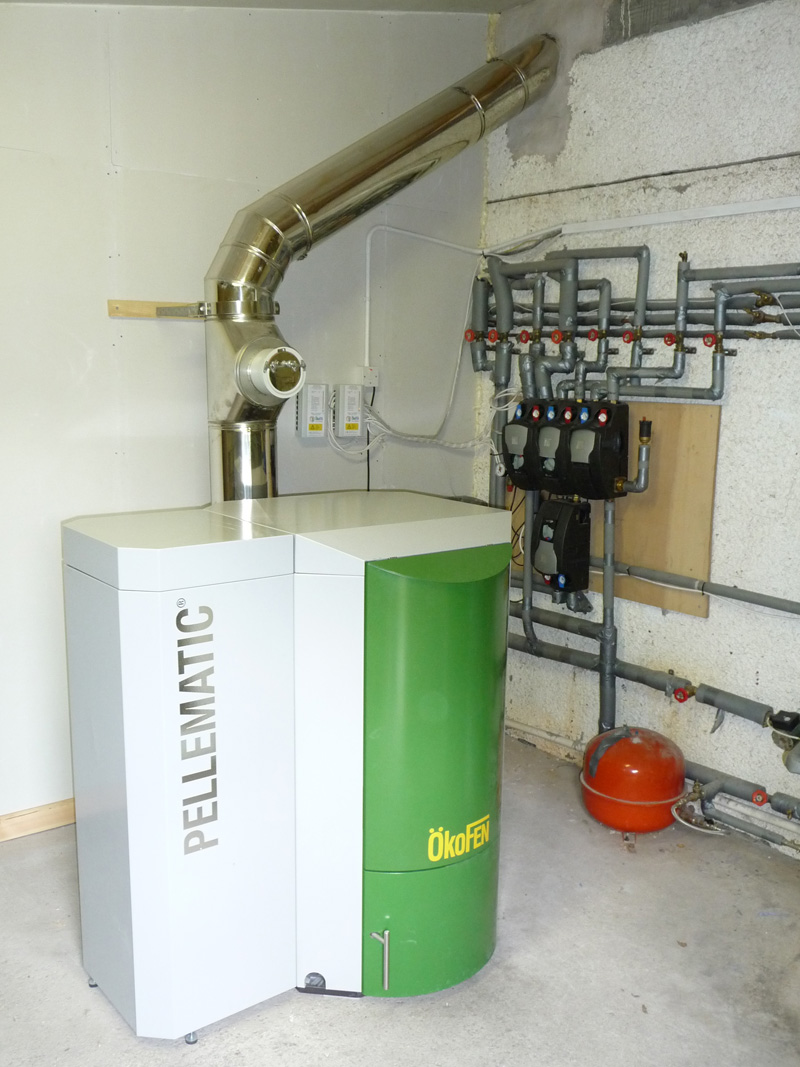
Pellet-burning central heating system in a basement of a family home

Most pellet stoves are self-igniting and cycle themselves on and off under thermostatic control. Stoves with automatic ignition can be equipped with remote controls. Recent innovations include integrated microcontroller monitoring of various safety conditions and can run diagnostic tests if an imminent problem arises.

A properly cleaned and maintained pellet stove should not create creosote, the sticky, flammable substance that causes chimney fires. Pellets burn very cleanly and create only a layer of fine ash as a byproduct of combustion. The grade of pellet fuel affects the performance and ash output. Premium-grade pellets produce less than one percent ash content, while standard or low grade pellets produce up to six percent ash. Pellet stove users should be aware of the extra maintenance required with a lower grade pellet, and that inconsistent wood quality can cause serious effects to the electronic machinery over a short period of time.

A pellet stove is normally associated with pelletized wood. However, many pellet stoves will also burn fuels such as grain, corn, seeds, or woodchips. In some pellet stoves, these fuels may need to be mixed with wood pellets. Pelletized trash (containing mostly waste paper) is also a fuel for pellet stoves.

Unlike wood stoves, which operate exclusively on a principle of chimney draft, a pellet stove must use a specially sealed exhaust pipe to prevent exhaust gases escaping into the living space due to the air pressure produced by a combustion blower. Pellet stoves require certified double-walled venting, normally three or four inches in diameter with a stainless steel interior and galvanized exterior. Because pellet stoves have a forced exhaust system, they have the advantage of not always requiring a vertical rise to vent, although a 3-to-5-foot (0.91 to 1.52 m) vertical run to induce some draft is recommended to prevent leakage in the case of a power outage. Like a modern gas appliance, pellet stoves can be vented horizontally through an outside wall and terminated below the roof line, making it an excellent choice for structures without an existing chimney. If an existing chimney is available, manufacturers urge use of a correctly sized stainless steel liner the length of the chimney for proper drafting. Modern building techniques have created tightly sealed homes, forcing many pellet stove manufacturers to recommend their stoves be installed with outside air intake to ensure the stoves will run efficiently and prevent potential negative pressure within the home.

In many states pellet fuel is exempt from sales tax.

== Tax credit ==
Until January 1, 2012, in most states in the U.S., a 75% efficient pellet stove was eligible for a tax credit up to 30% of the cost of the appliance as part of the 25C provision, plus labor.

== Principles of operation ==
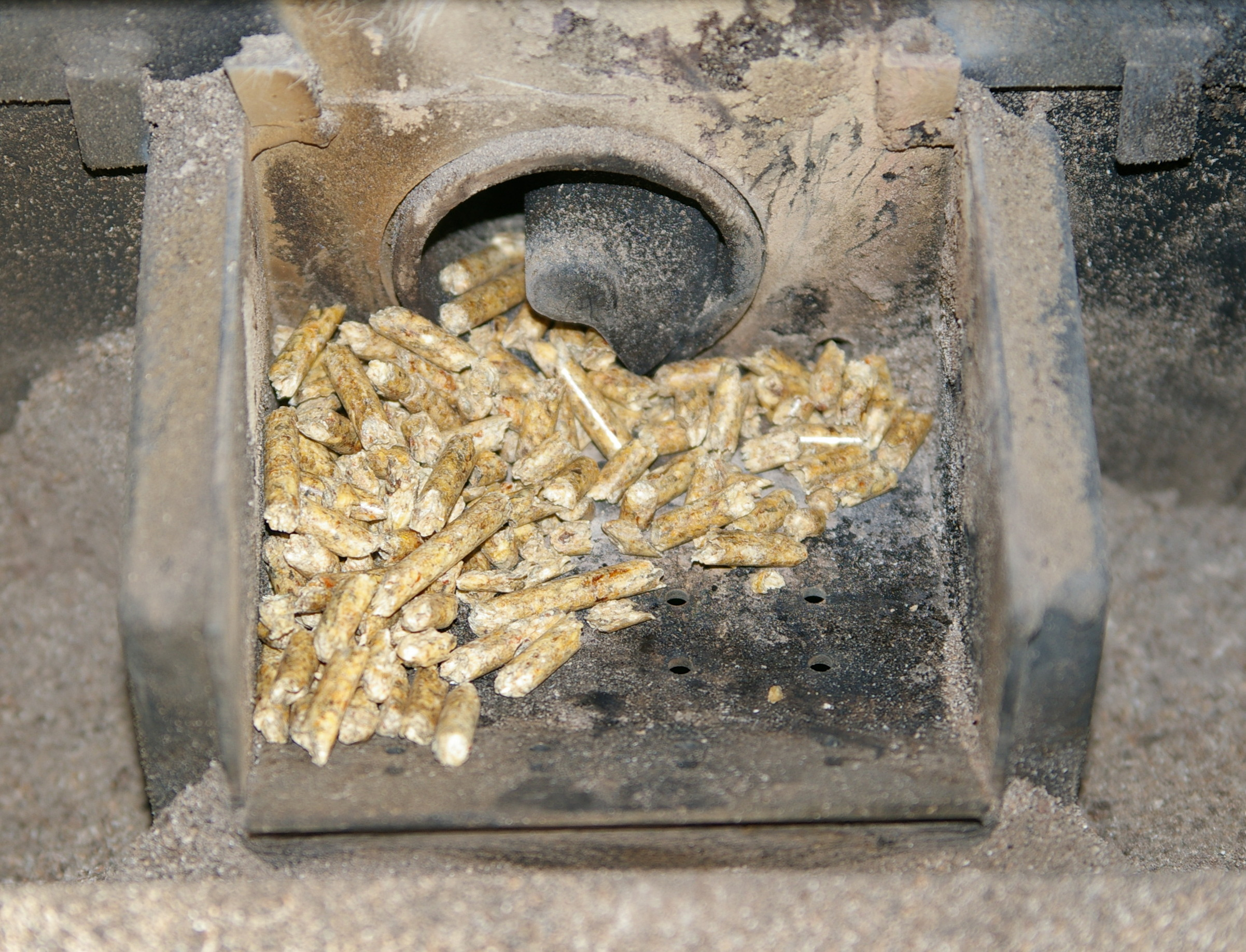
A pellet stove burn pot

A pellet stove normally consists of these components, whether basic or complex:

- A hopper
- An auger system
- Two blower fans: combustion and convection
- A firebox: burn pot and ash collection system, sometimes lined with ceramic fiber panels
- Various safety features (vacuum switch, heat sensors)
- A controller

To properly function, a pellet stove uses electricity and can be connected to a standard electrical outlet. A pellet stove, like an automatic coal stoker, is a consistent heater consuming fuel that is fed evenly from a refillable hopper into the burn pot (a perforated cast-iron or steel basin), through a motorized system. The most commonly used distributor is an auger system that consists of a spiral length of metal encased in a tube. This mechanism is either located above the burn pot or slightly beneath and guides a portion of pellet fuel from the hopper upwards until it falls into the burn pot for combustion.

Fan systems are necessary for clean, economical performance. The flame produced is concentrated and intense in the small area of the burn pot as a combustion blower introduces air into the bottom of the burn pot, while also forcing exhaust gases into the chimney. While some pellet stoves will be hot to the touch (especially on the viewing window), most manufacturers utilize a series of cast-iron or steel heat exchangers that run along the back and top areas of the visible firebox. With a convection blower, room air is circulated through the heat exchangers and directed into the living space. This method allows for a much higher efficiency than the radiant heat of a hand-fed wood or coal stove, and will in most cases cause the top, sides, and back of the stove to be at most warm to the touch. Along with convection air, an exhaust fan forces air from the firebox through special venting specifically made for pellet fuel. This cycle of circulation is an integral part of the combustion system as well, for the concentrated high temperature flame will quickly overheat the firebox. The possible problems associated with overheating are electrical component failure and flames traveling into the auger tube causing a hopper fire. As safeguards, all pellet stoves are equipped with heat sensors, and sometimes vacuum sensors, enabling the controller to shut down if an unsafe condition is detected. For daily maintenance, an ash vacuum is recommended. These are similar to shop vacs, but are designed for the removal of ash materials. These vacuums are available with a pellet stove kit which enables the cleaning of the interior areas of the stove which improves efficiency.

Pellet stoves can either be lit manually or through an automatic igniter. The igniter piece resembles a car's electric cigarette lighter heating coil. Most models have automatic ignition and can be readily equipped with thermostats or remote controls.

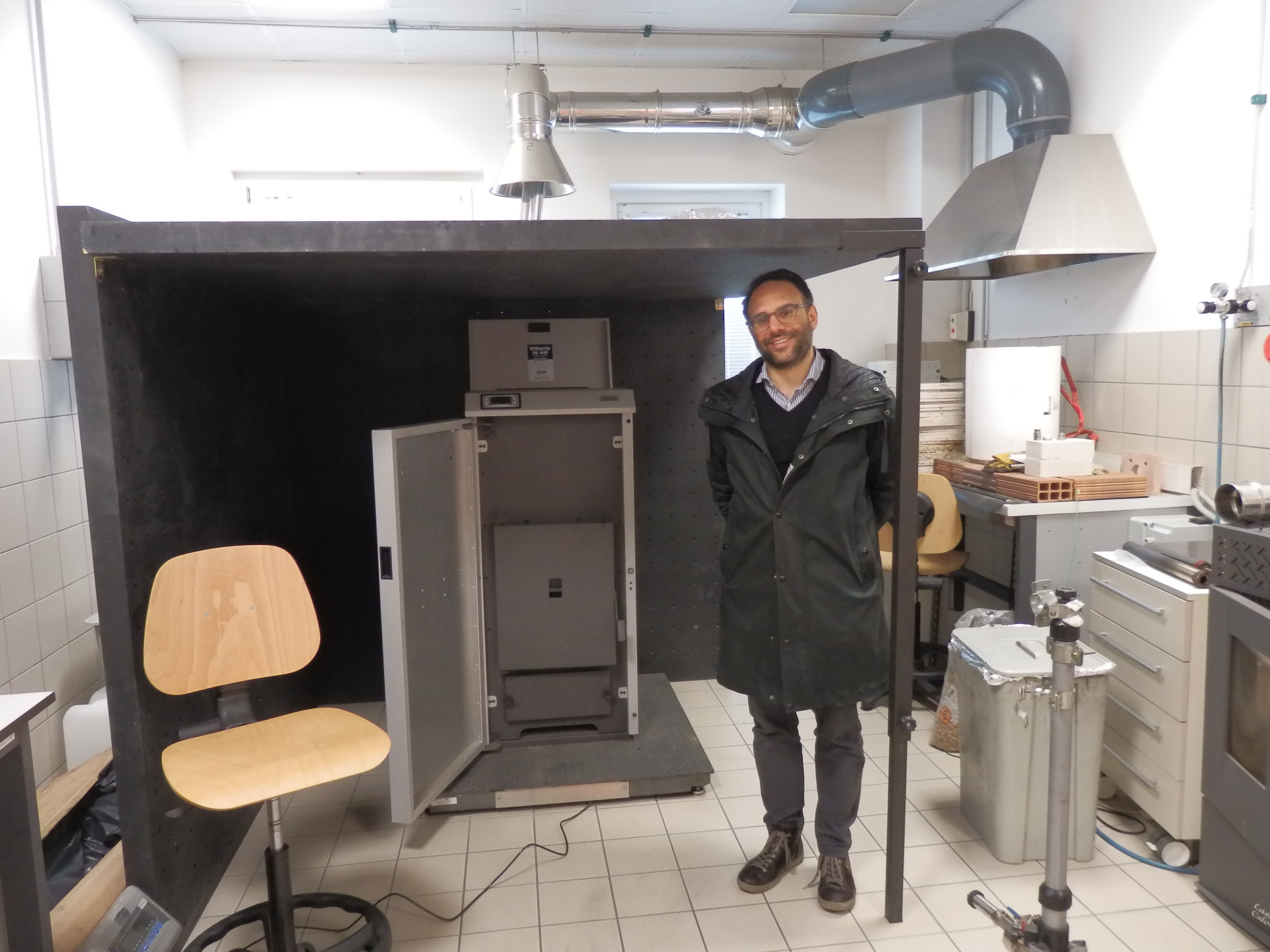
Pellet stoves are routinely tested in laboratory for improved performances and different fuels

=== Corn stove ===
A corn stove is designed for whole-kernel shelled corn kernel combustion and is similar to a pellet stove. The chief difference between a pellet stove and a dedicated corn stove is the addition of metal stirring rod within the burnpot or an active ash removal system. These vary in design slightly, but usually consist of one long metal stalk with smaller rods welded at a perpendicular angle, in order to churn the burn pot as it spins. An active ash removal system consists of augers at the bottom of the burn pot that evacuate the ash and clinkers. During a normal burn cycle, the sugar content within corn (and other similar bio-fuels) will cause the ashes to stick together, forming a hard mass. The metal stirring rod breaks apart these masses, causing a much more consistent burn. While there is demand to create stoves that are able to burn multiple fuels with minimal adjustments, some pellet stoves are not designed to stir fuel and cannot burn corn fuel.

== See also ==
- Biofuel
- European Biomass Association
- Heat exchanger
- Pellet mill
- Pellet smoker
