= Combustion efficiency =

Efficiency of converting fuel into heat energy

Combustion efficiency refers to the effectiveness of the burning process in converting fuel into heat energy. It is measured by the proportion of fuel that is efficiently burned and converted into useful heat, while minimizing the emissions of pollutants.

Specifically, it may refer to:

- fuel efficiency
- engine efficiency

depending on whether the level of efficiency is determined by the fuel itself or the combustion chamber or engine.
