= Rumford =

Rumford may refer to:

== People ==
- William Byron Rumford (1908–1986), California politician
- Sir Benjamin Thompson, Count Rumford (1753–1814), American-British-German inventor, scientist, soldier, and official
- Kennerley Rumford (1870–1957), English baritone singer

== Places ==
=== United States ===
- Rumford, Maine, a New England town
  - Rumford (CDP), Maine, the main village in the town
- Rumford, New Hampshire, former name of Concord, New Hampshire
- Rumford, Rhode Island
- Rumford, South Dakota
- The Rumford River in Massachusetts

=== United Kingdom ===
- Rumford, Falkirk, a village in the Falkirk council area of Scotland
- Rumford, Cornwall, a hamlet near Wadebridge in Cornwall

=== Moon ===
- Rumford (crater), a location on the far side of the Moon

== Other ==
- Rumford brand baking powder, a Clabber Girl brand
- Rumford Fair Housing Act, California law repealed by California Proposition 14 (1964)
- Rumford fireplace, an improved household fireplace
- Rumford furnace, a kiln for making quicklime
- Rumford Medal, science award made annually by the Royal Society
- Rumford Prize, science award made annually by the American Academy of Arts and Sciences
- Rumford's Soup, a cheap, nutritious food invented by Count Rumford

== See also ==
- Romford
