= Maksutov (crater) =

Crater on the Moon

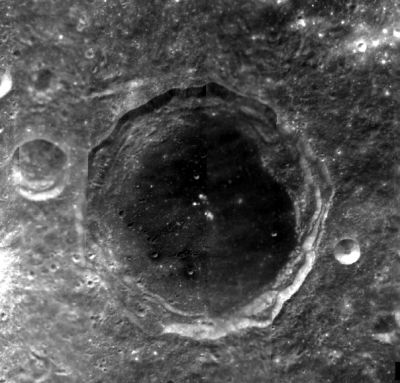
- Clementine mosaic
- Coordinates: 40.5°S 168.7°W
- Diameter: 83 km
- Depth: 3270 m
- Colongitude: 170° at sunrise
- Eponym: Dmitri D. Maksutov

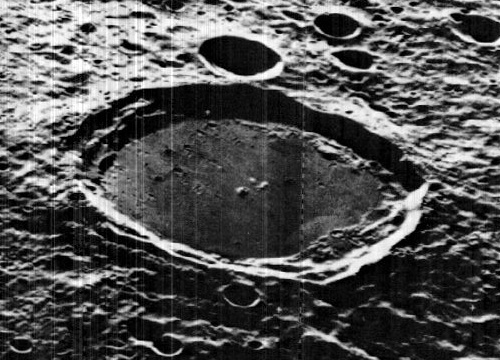
Oblique Lunar Orbiter 5 image

Maksutov is a crater on the far side of the Moon. It is located just to the south-southwest of the larger walled plain named Oppenheimer. To the southwest lies the crater Nishina, and to the west-northwest is the merged crater pairing of Davisson and Leibnitz.

This crater has a reasonably well-defined outer rim that has not been significantly degraded through impact erosion. The more notable feature of this crater, however, is the flooded interior floor. This nearly level interior surface has the lower albedo that is characteristic of a basaltic-lava-covered floor. The inner wall of the rim varies in width, with the narrowest portion lying in the southeast, while wider sections lie along the remaining edges, particularly to the northeast and northwest. The depth of the crater here is defined as the distance between the highest point on the rim to the lowest area of the crater floor, not including the floor's impact craters. The spectra of this peak fits an olivine-bearing gabbroic norite mineralogy, which originated from a depth of 8.3 to 13.1 km.

Prior to formal naming in 1970 by the IAU, the crater was known as Crater 439.

== Satellite craters ==
By convention these features are identified on lunar maps by placing the letter on the side of the crater midpoint that is closest to Maksutov.

Maksutov	Latitude	Longitude	Diameter
U	40.1° S	170.9° W	21 km
