= Nassau (crater) =

Crater on the Moon

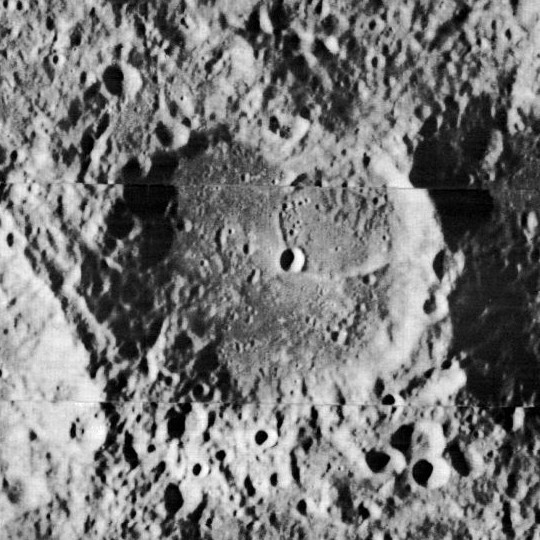
- Lunar Orbiter 2 image
- Coordinates: 24.9°S 177.4°E
- Diameter: 76 km
- Depth: Unknown
- Colongitude: 177° at sunrise
- Eponym: Jason J. Nassau

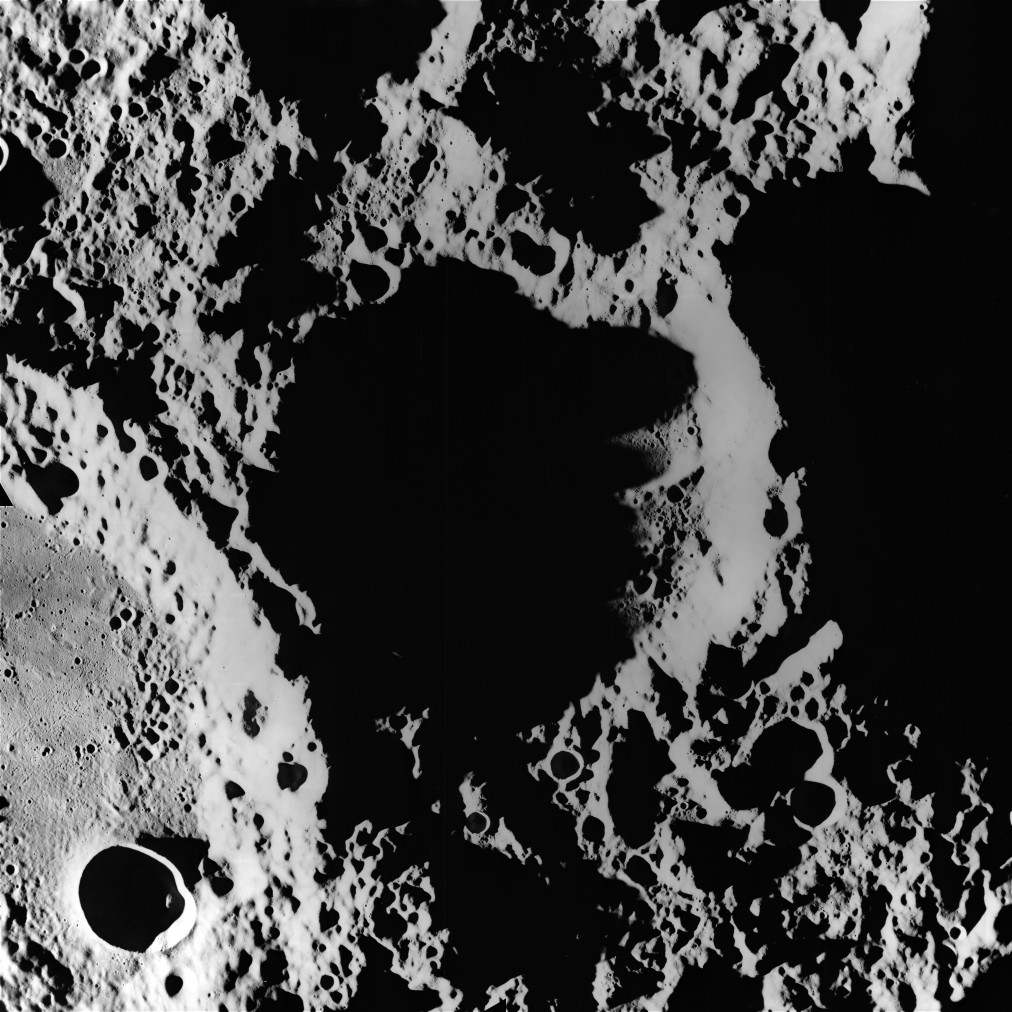
View from Apollo 15 with very low sun angle

Nassau is a lunar impact crater on the Moon's far side. It abuts against the northeastern rim of the figure-8-shaped crater Van de Graaff. To the southeast of Nassau lies the crater Leeuwenhoek, and to the east is Orlov.

Nassau has a somewhat eroded crater rim, with small craters lying across the edge along the eastern, northwestern and southwestern sides. Along the southwestern inner wall, where the crater joins Van de Graaff, a ridge of material extends northward part way into the interior floor. The bottom of the crater is nearly level, but is marked by several small craterlets. The most notable of these interior craters lies near the midpoint.

== Satellite craters ==
By convention these features are identified on lunar maps by placing the letter on the side of the crater midpoint that is closest to Nassau.

Nassau	Latitude	Longitude	Diameter
D	23.7° S	179.2° W	62 km
F	24.7° S	179.2° W	112 km
Y	22.5° S	176.8° E	38 km
