= Leeuwenhoek (crater) =

Crater on the Moon

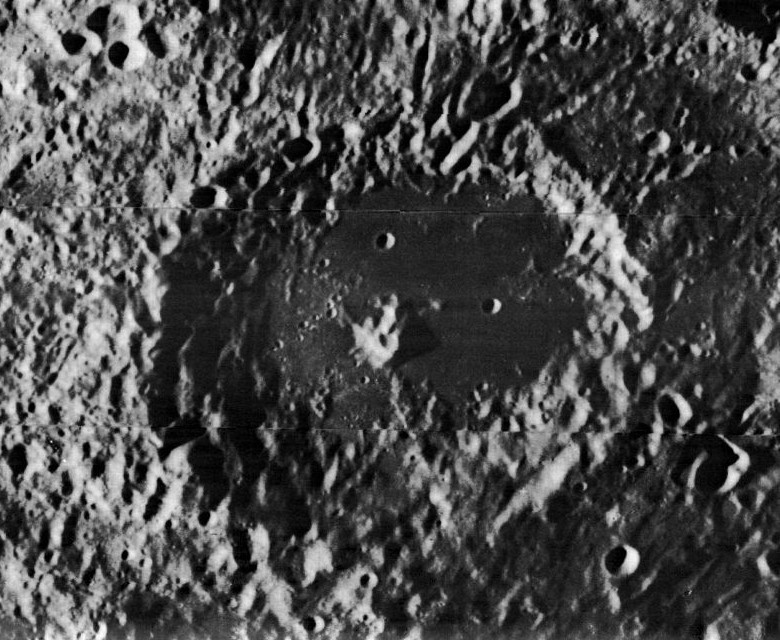
- Lunar Orbiter 2 image
- Coordinates: 29.3°S 178.7°W
- Diameter: 125 km
- Depth: 2.4 km
- Colongitude: 180° at sunrise
- Formation: Nectarian
- Eponym: Antony van Leeuwenhoek

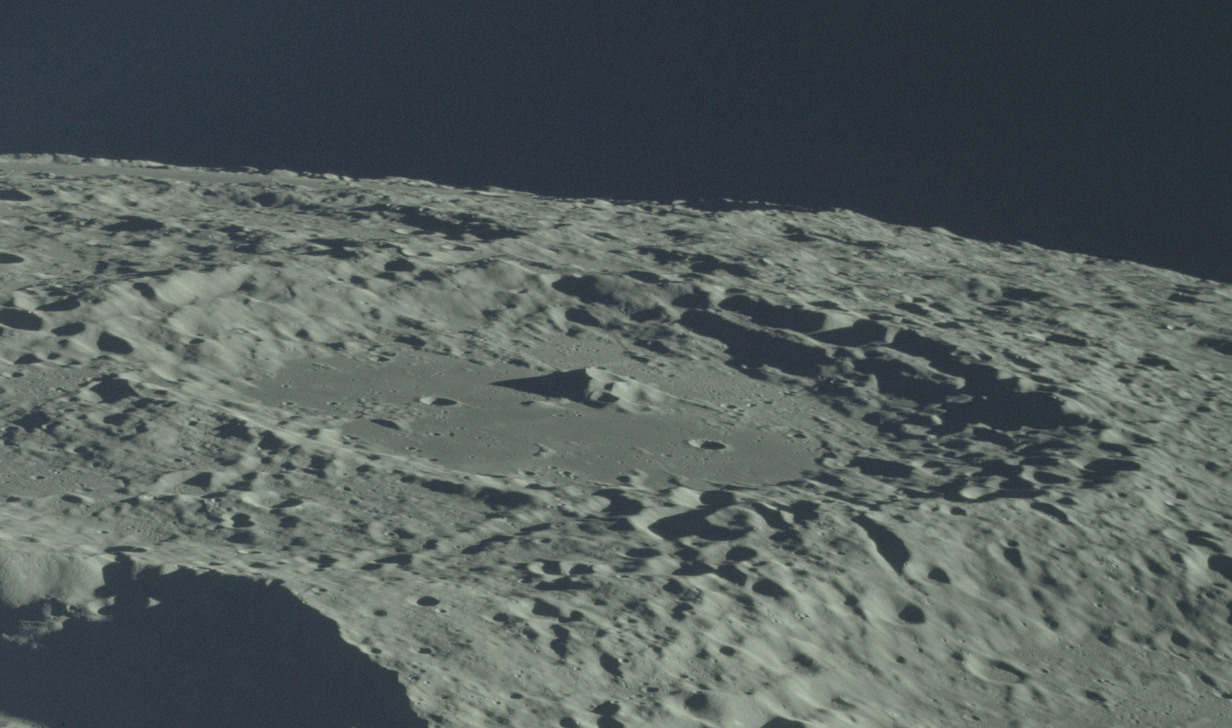
Oblique view from Apollo 17

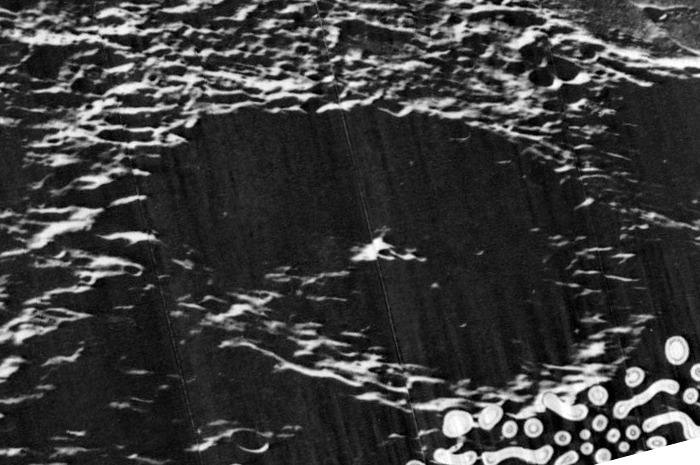
Another oblique Lunar Orbiter 5 image, facing west

Leeuwenhoek is a lunar impact crater that lies in the Moon's southern hemisphere, on the far side from the Earth. It is located to the east of the crater Birkeland and the unusual double crater Van de Graaff. To the northeast of Leeuwenhoek is Orlov and to the south is a large walled plain named Leibnitz. It is named after Antonie van Leeuwenhoek.

On the lunar geologic timescale, this formation dates to the Nectarian period. The outer rim of Leeuwenhoek is worn and eroded, forming an irregular mountainous ring about the relatively level interior floor. The inner wall is wider along the western and southern sides, offsetting the floor to the northeast. At the midpoint of the interior is a central peak formation. There are a pair of small craterlets on the floor and several tiny craters. Leeuwenhoek partly overlaps the satellite crater Leeuwenhoek E to the northeast.

== Satellite craters ==
By convention these features are identified on lunar maps by placing the letter on the side of the crater midpoint that is closest to Leeuwenhoek.

Leeuwenhoek	Latitude	Longitude	Diameter
E	28.2° S	176.7° W	117 km
