= Rumford roaster =

Early cast iron oven

The Rumford roaster is an early cast iron oven, invented by Sir Benjamin Thompson, Count Rumford, around 1800. It was part of his development of the kitchen range, which gave more control of the cooking and saved fuel. He published his research in 1805.

The Rumford roaster is a cylinder of cast-iron set into a brick wall. It is heated by a separate firebox below, and the ashes fall into a lower box. Coal or charcoal is burned to get the oven and bricks up to temperature, then the bricks continue to heat the oven after the fuel is burnt. Rumford's invention distributed heat evenly around the food. A system of moisture-venting tubes and blowpipes improved browning.

A similar design, the Reip "Bake Oven and Roaster", was patented by Henry Reip in 1825.

The Rumford roaster was often built next to a Rumford fireplace, in the wall of a kitchen.

The Rumford roaster was ultimately made obsolete by improvements in cast-iron technology. This allowed the development of the closed-fire cooking range, which enabled even more control over cooking.

At the World's Columbian Exposition, 1893, a kitchen design described as the "Rumford Kitchen" was exhibited.

== Examples ==
- Rundlet-May House, Portsmouth, New Hampshire
- Lorenzo, New York
- Hamilton Hall, Salem, Massachusetts

== See also ==
- Rumford fireplace
