= Nishina (crater) =

Crater on the Moon

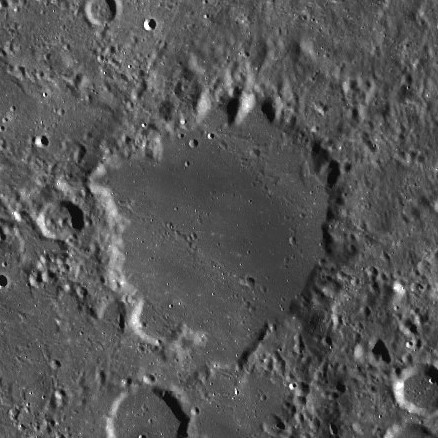
- LRO image
- Coordinates: 44.6°S 170.4°W
- Diameter: 65 km
- Depth: Unknown
- Colongitude: 172° at sunrise
- Eponym: Yoshio Nishina

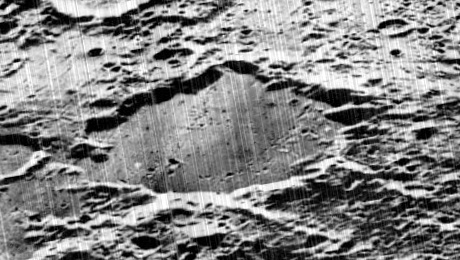
Oblique Lunar Orbiter 5 image

Nishina is the remnant of a lunar impact crater that is located in the southern hemisphere on the far side of the Moon. It lies to the south-southwest of the crater Maksutov, to the southeast of Finsen and Leibniz.

The rim of this formation has been eroded, worn down, and reshaped by a history of impacts, leaving an irregular, indented perimeter surrounding the crater floor. The interior of the formation has been resurfaced by basaltic lava, leaving a level, nearly featureless surface that contains no impacts of note. While the interior surface has a low albedo and appears dark, it has been coated by ray material which has produced lighter patches to the southwest and northeast.

Prior to formal naming in 1970 by the IAU, the crater was known as Crater 436.

== Satellite craters ==
By convention these features are identified on lunar maps by placing the letter on the side of the crater midpoint that is closest to Nishina.

Nishina	Latitude	Longitude	Diameter
T	43.7° S	174.4° W	28 km
