= Benjamin Thompson House–Count Rumford Birthplace =

Historic house in Massachusetts, United States

- Count Rumford Birthplace
- U.S. National Register of Historic Places
- U.S. National Historic Landmark
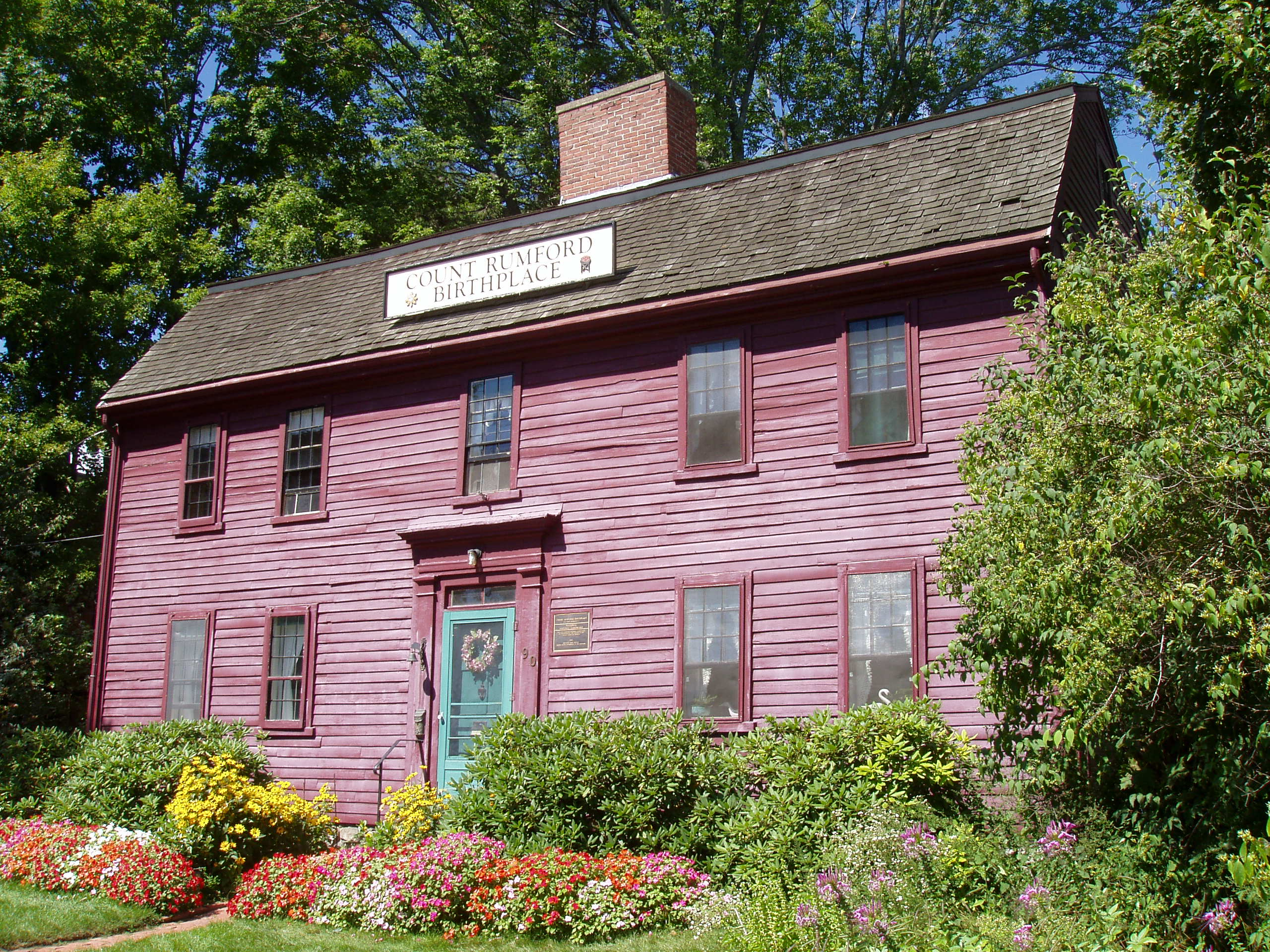
- Benjamin Thompson House, Woburn, Massachusetts

- Location within Massachusetts Location within the United States
- Location: 90 Elm St., Woburn, Massachusetts
- Coordinates: 42°28′45″N 71°8′50″W
- Built: 1714
- NRHP reference No.: 75001942
- Designated NHL: May 15, 1975

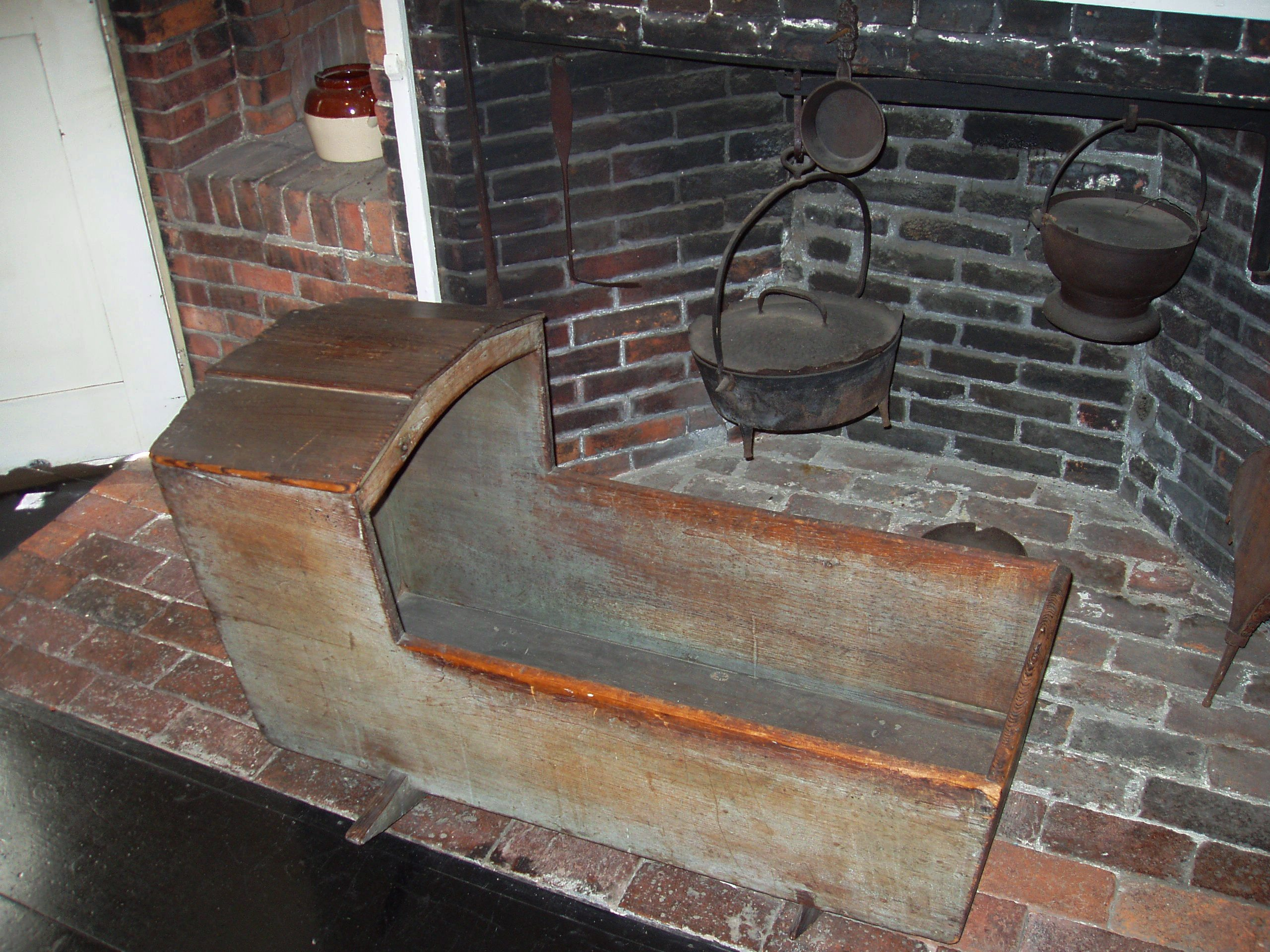
Benjamin Thompson's cradle, exhibited within the house. A Rumford fireplace, with its shallow angled sides, is visible in the background.

The Benjamin Thompson House (also known as the Count Rumford Birthplace) is a historic house museum and National Historic Landmark at 90 Elm Street, in the North Woburn area of Woburn, Massachusetts. It is significant as the birthplace of scientist and inventor Benjamin Thompson (1753–1814), who became Count Rumford of the Holy Roman Empire as well as Sir Benjamin Thompson of the United Kingdom. His birthplace was designated a National Historic Landmark in 1975 in recognition of Rumford's scientific accomplishments, which notably include the development of the Rumford fireplace, a fireplace design that was significantly more efficient at retaining heat in the house than older and larger fireplaces.

== Description and history ==
The Rumford House is a 2 1/2-story wood-frame structure, five bays wide, with a gambrel roof and a large central chimney. The exterior is sheathed in clapboards, and decoration is limited to a modest front door surround. The interior includes a great deal of well-preserved original hardware and woodwork.

The house was built in 1714 by Ebenezer Thompson. His grandson, Benjamin Thompson Jr., later to become Count Rumford, was born on March 26, 1753, in the west end of this house, which his parents had lived in since their marriage. Young Benjamin's father died on November 7, 1754, and he lived in the house with his grandfather and mother until she married Josiah Pierce Jr., of Woburn, and he was taken to live in his house.

Benjamin Thompson was a Loyalist during the American Revolution, and fled the country in 1775 when the British evacuated Boston. He returned later in the war commanding the King's American Dragoons, who saw action in the Southern states. He returned to England after the British surrender. He eventually settled for a time in the Holy Roman Empire, where he acquired the title of Count Rumford, and where he performed his groundbreaking research into the design of heating systems. This research resulted in a series of improvements to home heating systems, notably the Rumford fireplace, a shallow fireplace that more efficiently projected heat into a room than older and larger fireplaces. While in Munich, Thompson oversaw reforms of the indigent welfare system of Bavaria, and designed the city's famous English Garden. Thompson was also an inveterate and practical tinkerer, developing new versions of everyday utensils. He also proposed in 1799 the establishment in the United Kingdom of a research organization, which resulted in the founding of the Royal Institution. Although he never returned to the country of his birth, he did endow a professorial chair at Harvard College, and established the Rumford Prize, an annual award given by the American Academy of Arts and Sciences. He died in Paris in 1814.

== Current ownership ==
The birthplace of Benjamin Thompson is now owned by the Rumford Historical Association, founded in 1877 to maintain it as a site of historic interest. In its museum are reconstructed models of Count Rumford's scientific experiments and inventions. A copy of a portrait of Count Rumford by Gainsborough is on display. The house also has a library of Rumford biographies and essays. It is open Sunday afternoons 1–4:30 pm from June through October and by appointment. Admission is free.

== See also ==
- Loammi Baldwin, childhood friend of Benjamin Thompson
- National Register of Historic Places listings in Middlesex County, Massachusetts
- List of National Historic Landmarks in Massachusetts
