= Eratosthenian =

Lunar geologic period

Chronology
Periods on the Lunar Geologic Timescale. Axis scale: Millions of years ago.

Usage information
- Celestial body: Earth's Moon
- Time scale(s) used: Lunar Geologic Timescale

Definition
- Chronological unit: Period

The Eratosthenian period in the lunar geologic timescale runs from 3.2 billion years ago to 1.1 billion years ago. It is named after the crater Eratosthenes, which displays characteristics typical of craters of this age, including a surface that is not significantly eroded by subsequent impacts, but which also does not possess a ray system.

The massive basaltic volcanism of the Imbrian period tapered off and ceased during this long span of lunar time. The youngest lunar lava flows identified from orbital images are tentatively placed near the end of this period. Its equivalent on Earth consists of most of the Mesoarchean and Neoarchean eras (Archean eon), Paleoproterozoic and Mesoproterozoic eras (Proterozoic eon).

== Examples ==
Other than Eratosthenes itself, examples of large Eratosthenian craters on the near side of the Moon include Langrenus, Macrobius, Aristoteles, Hausen, Moretus, Pythagoras, Scoresby, Bullialdus, Plutarch, and Cavalerius. On the far side, examples include Olcott, Hamilton, Birkeland, Finsen, Kirkwood, and Ricco.

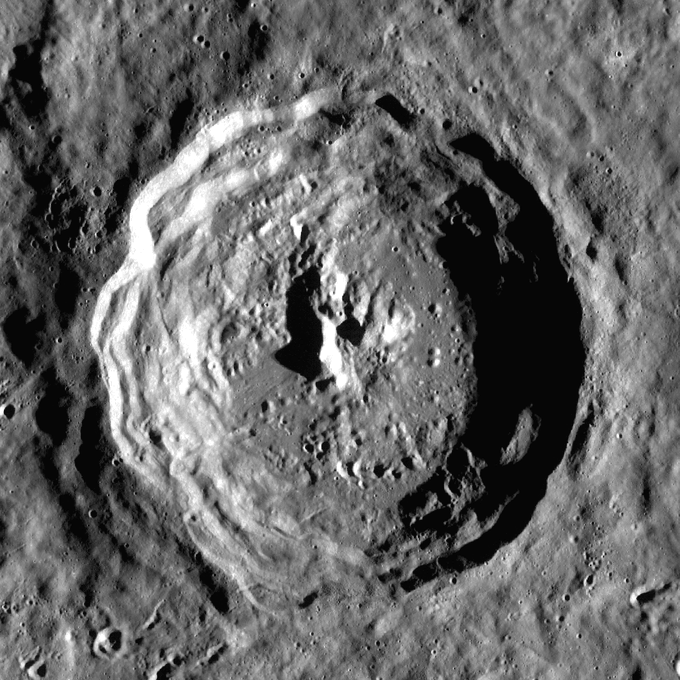
Eratosthenes

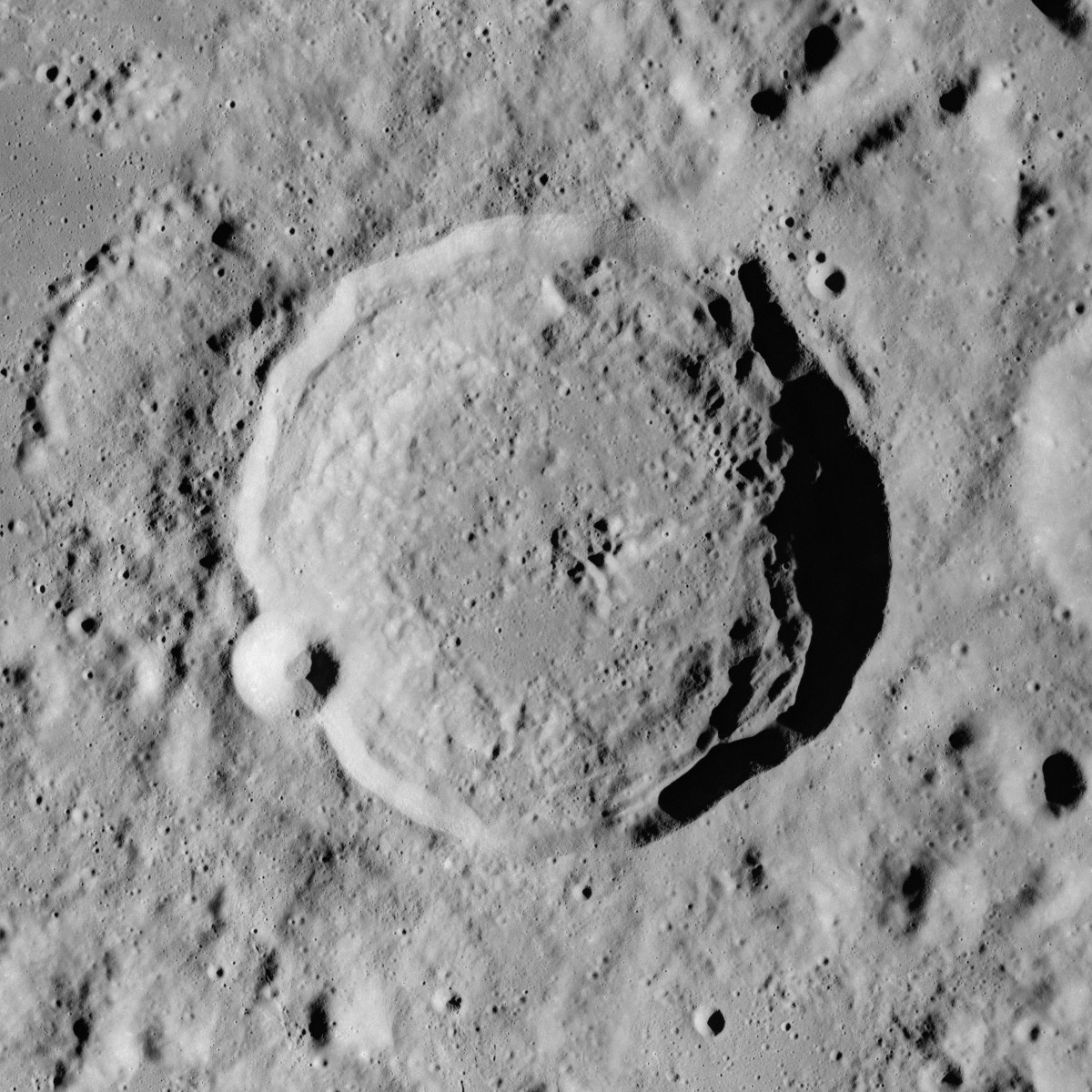
Macrobius

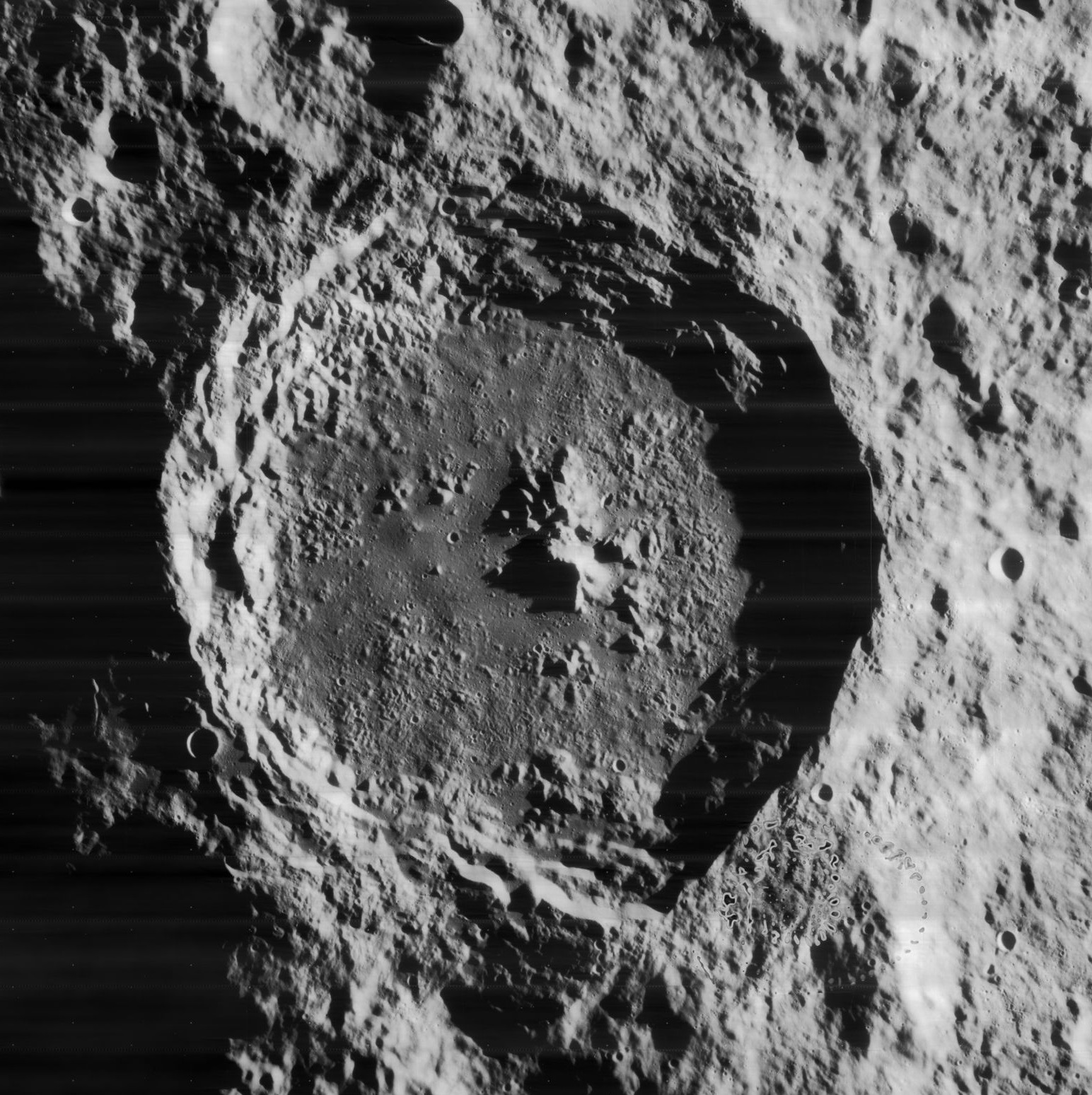
Hausen

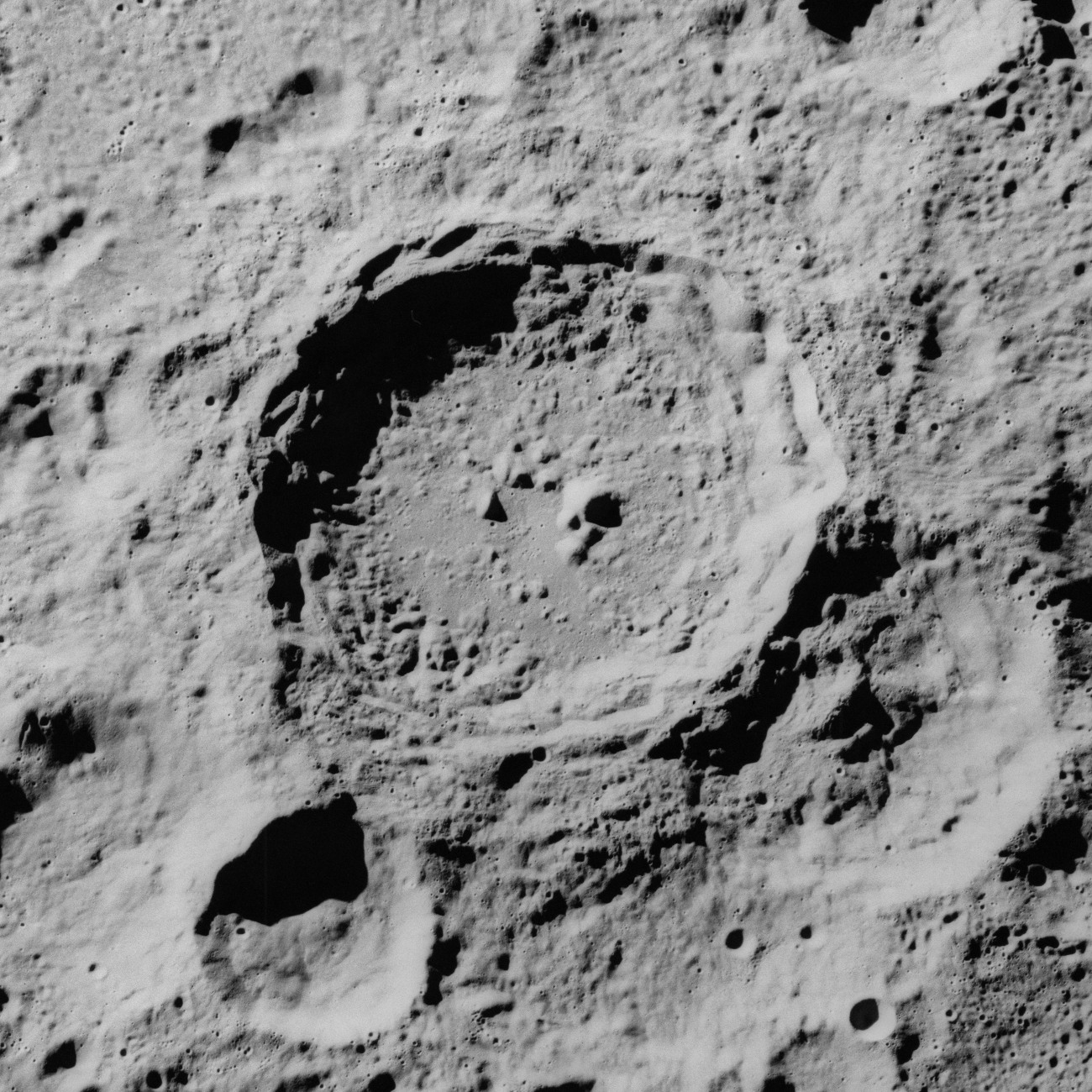
Olcott

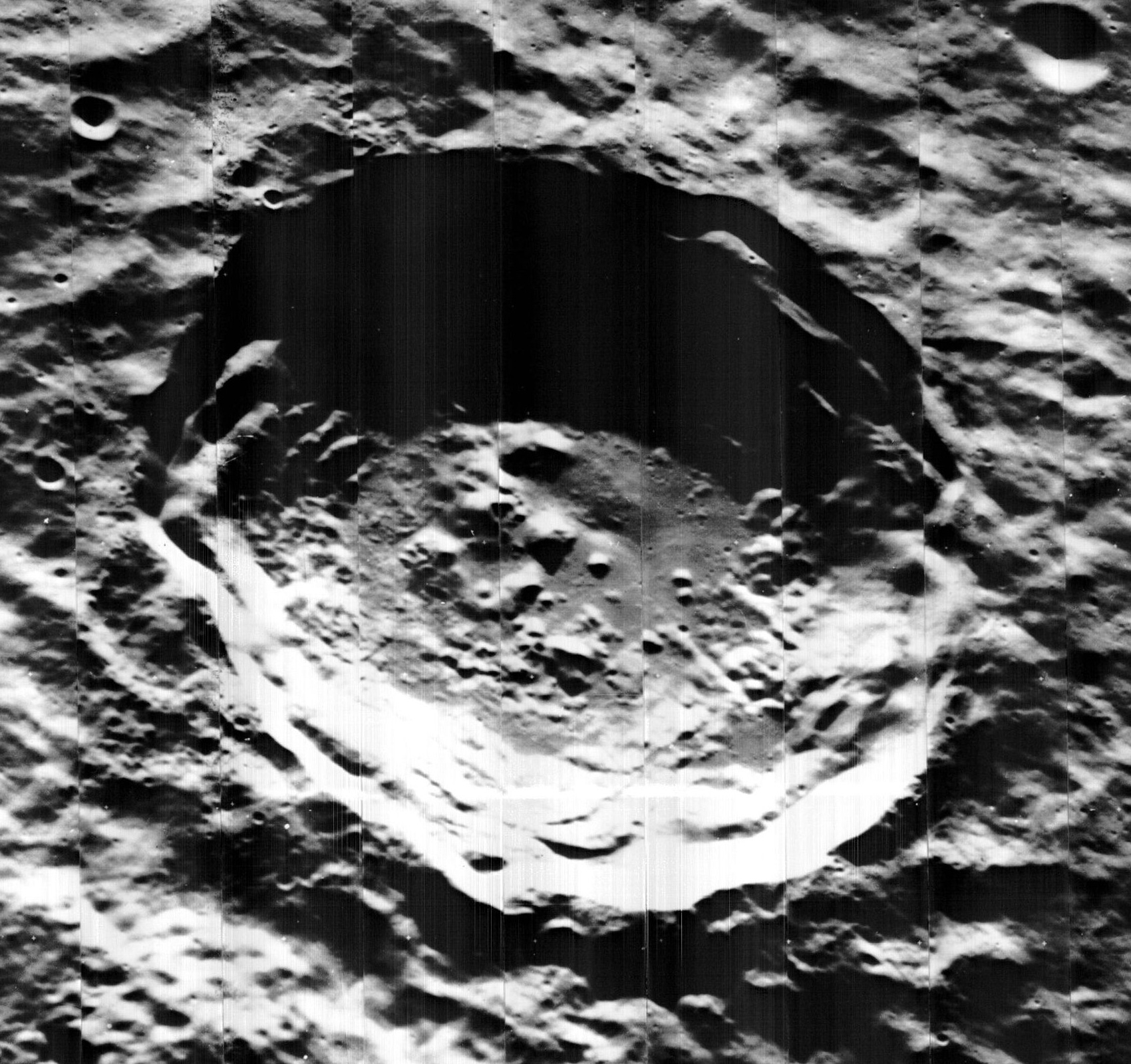
Kirkwood
