= Rumford (crater) =

Crater on the Moon

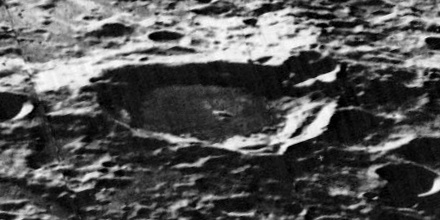
- Oblique Lunar Orbiter 5 image
- Coordinates: 28.8°S 169.8°W
- Diameter: 61 km
- Depth: Unknown
- Colongitude: 190° at sunrise
- Formation: Imbrian
- Eponym: Count Rumford

Rumford is a lunar impact crater that lies on the far side of the Moon. It is located to the northwest of the large crater Oppenheimer, and to the east-southeast of Orlov.

On the lunar geologic timescale, this crater dates to the Imbrian period. It lies across the eastern rim of the larger satellite crater Rumford T. The perimeter is somewhat rounded and polygonal in shape, with an outward protrusion along the eastern edge. The inner walls have slumped along the eastern half to produce a shelf along the sides. The interior floor has a lower albedo than the surrounding terrain, and there is a small central ridge near the midpoint.

== Satellite craters ==
By convention these features are identified on lunar maps by placing the letter on the side of the crater midpoint that is closest to Rumford.

Rumford	Latitude	Longitude	Diameter
A	25.2° S	169.2° W	30 km
B	25.2° S	168.1° W	25 km
C	27.4° S	168.1° W	26 km
F	28.9° S	165.3° W	13 km
Q	30.7° S	171.6° W	29 km
T	28.6° S	172.1° W	108 km
