= Birkeland (lunar crater) =

Lunar impact crater

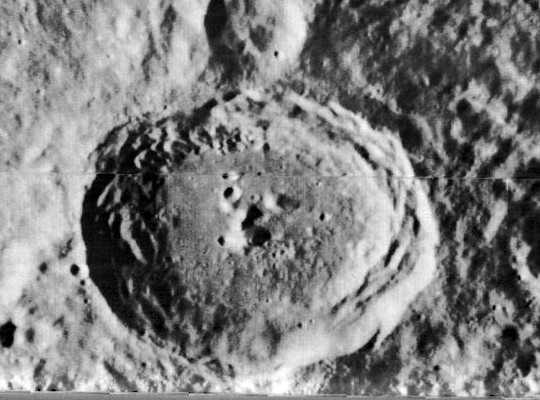
- Lunar Orbiter 2 image
- Coordinates: 30.2°S 173.9°W
- Diameter: 81.64 km (50.73 mi)
- Depth: Unknown
- Colongitude: 187° at sunrise
- Formation: Eratosthenian
- Eponym: O. Kristian Birkeland

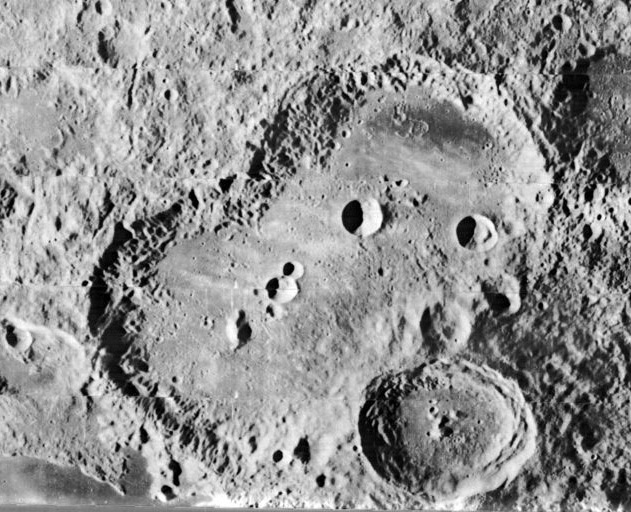
Van de Graff crater with Birkeland at lower right

Birkeland is a lunar impact crater that lies in the southern hemisphere on the far side of the Moon. This crater is attached to the central waist of the oddly shaped Van de Graaff crater formation, and may partly account for that crater's figure-8 shape. To the southeast is the large walled plain named Leibnitz. Birkeland is located within the South Pole-Aitken basin (SPA).

This formation dates to the Eratosthenian epoch of the lunar geologic timescale. It has not been significantly eroded, and the outer rim is well-defined with a well-terraced inner walls around much of the interior. The rim has a slight inward bulge along the north where it is attached to the Van de Graaff formation.

The interior floor is relatively level, except in the southeast where there is some rough terrain. There is a central peak formation at the midpoint. The spectra of this orthopyroxene-rich central peak fits a olivine-bearing norite mineralogy, which originated from a depth of 8.2 to 12.9 km. The crater has a strong thorium anomaly, which is consistent with excavated material from the differentiated melt sheet created by the SPA impact.

This crater is named after Norwegian physicist O. Kristian Birkeland (1867–1917). Its designation was formally adopted by the International Astronomical Union in 1970.

== Satellite craters ==
By convention these features are identified on lunar maps by placing the letter on the side of the crater midpoint that is closest to Birkeland.

Birkeland	Latitude	Longitude	Diameter
M	32.0° S	174.1° E	23 km
