= List of German soups =

This is a list of German soups. German cuisine has evolved as a national cuisine through centuries of social and political change with variations from region to region. In Germany, soups are a popular and significant food, and many Germans eat soup at least once a week. In German cuisine, it may be served as a first course or as a main course. The use of a roux to thicken soups is common in German cuisine. The use of legumes and lentils is significant and used in several German soups, such as split pea soup. Common soups in German restaurants include oxtail, beef or chicken broth with noodles, dumplings, or rice, goulash, split pea, cream of asparagus, turtle soup (Echte Schildkrötensuppe) and cream of lobster.

In the 1880s, Germans had an appreciation for soups prepared with beer as a primary ingredient, which was prepared with beer with a lesser alcohol content compared to standard beers. One recipe utilized beer, water, sugar, raisins, spices and grated, stale bread.

This list includes soups that originated in Germany as well as those that are common in the country.

== German soups ==
Name	Image	Type	Description
Asparagus Soup (Spargelsuppe)		Soup	A creamy soup made from asparagus.
Beer soup		Soup	In medieval Europe, it was served as a breakfast soup, sometimes poured over bread. Pictured is beer cheese soup.
Brain soup		Soup	
Bread soup		Soup	A simple soup that mainly consists of stale bread; variations exist in many countries, and it is often eaten during Lent. Bread soups are created with brown bread as well as with white bread.
Beansoup (Saarland Bohnesauf/Bippelches Bohnesupp)		Soup	Soup of beans, carrots, potatoes, onions and bacon
Borscht		Soup	A beetroot-based soup served with sour cream (schmand) and beef (originally from Ukraine)
Buttermilchsuppe		Soup	Buttermilk soup with flour dumplings
Cheese soup		Soup	All through the Middle Ages, soup prepared from cheese, eggs and pepper was commonly served in German monasteries. Pictured is a cheese and potato soup.
Crawfish soup		Soup	
Eintopf		Soup	A simple vegetable soup; small meat balls are optional but common in it.
Fliederbeersuppe		Dessert	A dessert soup made from elderberry, served with semolina dumplings
French onion soup		Soup	A very common soup in German cuisine.
Fruit soup		Soup	Cherry soup (pictured) has been described as a seemingly popular soup in Germany.
Goulash		Soup or stew	Pictured is Bavarian Gulasch mit Semmelknödel which is often made with a mix of beef and pork. Here it is served with a Semmelknödel, a bread dumpling.
Grumbeersupp un Quetschekuche		Main course	Potato soup and plum tart
Hamburger Aalsuppe (Hamburg Eel Soup)		Soup	A sweet and sour soup of eel, meat broth, dried fruits, vegetables, and herbs.
Hochzeitssuppe (literally "wedding soup")		Soup	A spicy meat broth with bread dumplings, liver dumplings and finely sliced pancakes
Kartoffelsuppe		Soup or stew	A stew made with raw potatoes and other ingredients such as vegetables and sausages.
Kuttelsuppe		Soup	A lightly bounded soup usually with acidified vinegar from tripe, regional spot or spots mentioned, which is common in variants in numerous countries.
Lentil soup		Soup	Prepared throughout the year in Germany, in part because the dry lentils store well.
Milk soup		Soup	Consumed with semolina by Germans in the 1880s.
Nudelsuppe		Soup	Strong chicken stock and noodles
Potato soup		Soup	A common soup throughout Germany.
Rumford's Soup		Soup	A simple soup prepared with barley or barley meal and dried peas as primary ingredients that was utilized in Munich and greater Bavaria to feed impoverished people.
Schälklöße		Soup	Consists of filled pasta and various vegetables.
Schwarzsauer		Soup	A type of pork blood soup with various spices cooked in vinegar-water. A sort of black pudding made with vinegar. The dish originated in eastern Prussia.
Snail soup		Soup	Can be found in Baden cuisine.

== In culture ==
The German tale of Suppenkasper in the children's book Der Struwwelpeter involves "a little boy who faded away because he refused to eat his soup".

== See also ==
- List of German cheeses
- List of German dishes
- List of soups
- List of stews
