= Sarah Thompson, Countess Rumford =

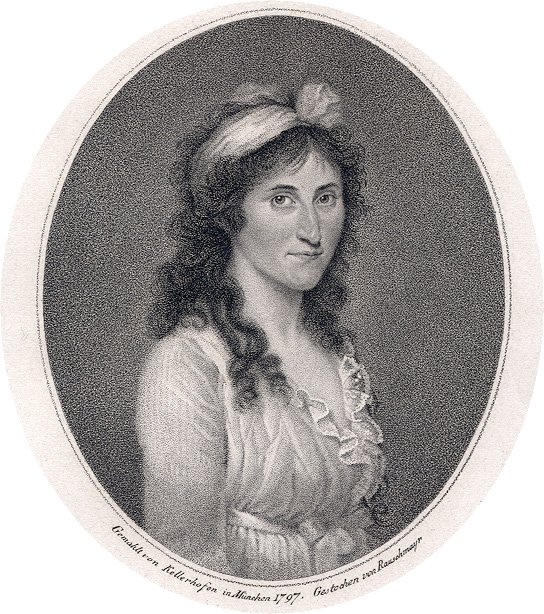
- Sarah Thompson, Countess Rumford, stipple engraving by Joseph Peter Paul Rauschmayer (1758–1815), after a portrait painted by Kellerhofen in Munich in 1797
- Born: 18 October 1774; Concord, New Hampshire
- Died: 2 December 1852 (aged 78); Concord, New Hampshire
- Known for: First American countess
- Parents: Benjamin Thompson (father); Sarah (née Walker) Rolfe Thompson (mother)

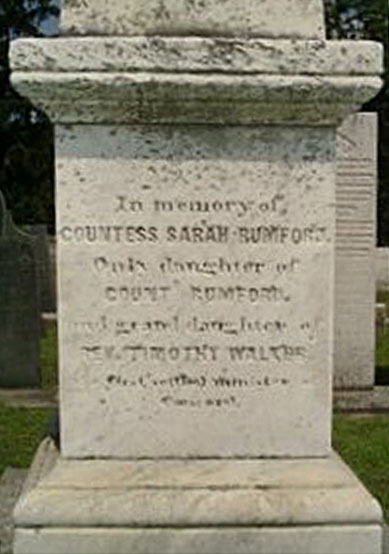
The countess's gravestone monument

Sarah Thompson, Countess Rumford, (18 October 1774 – 2 December 1852) was a philanthropist. She is the first American to be known as a Reichsgräfin or Imperial Countess, a Holy Roman Empire title granted by the Electorate of Bavaria.

== Biography ==
In 1774, Sarah was born. Sarah never married, and she never had children.

Sarah spent decades of her life in London and Paris, later returning to her birthplace, Concord, NH. Sarah was a writer of poetry, short stories, and biographical sketches. After the death of Benjamin Thompson, Sarah lived as a woman of independent means.

Sarah has an older half-brother Paul Rolfe, through her mother’s first marriage, and Sarah lived with Paul's wife Elizabeth in Concord, NH for a time after Paul's death in 1819.

Sarah has an illegitimate younger half-brother, Charles François Robert Lefebvre, who ultimately gained the use of the Rumford name through Sarah's bequest.

Sarah adopted Emma Gannell (1826-1923), daughter of Mary (née Grove), a young girl who had been living in Sarah's home when Emma was born.

In 1852, Sarah died, and left some of her estate "to a charitable purpose…bearing the name of the Rolfe and Rumford Asylum", a group home for girls, which stayed in operation for 129 years.

== Parents ==
Both her parents were born and brought up in the American colonies and married there in 1772. Thompson abandoned his American wife, Sarah, at the outbreak of the American Revolution; she died in 1792. During the American Revolutionary War of 1775 to 1783, her father Benjamin Thompson took the side of the British, and at the end of the war he moved to London. He was knighted in 1784.

Her mother was a rich and well-connected widow, an heiress named Sarah (née Walker) Rolfe, whose father was a minister, and whose late husband left her property at Rumford, Province of New Hampshire, which is today in the modern city of Concord, New Hampshire. They moved to the-now Portsmouth, New Hampshire.
