= Rumford furnace =

Kiln for the production of calcium oxide

Cross section of a Rumford furnace, with the fuel chamber at the left

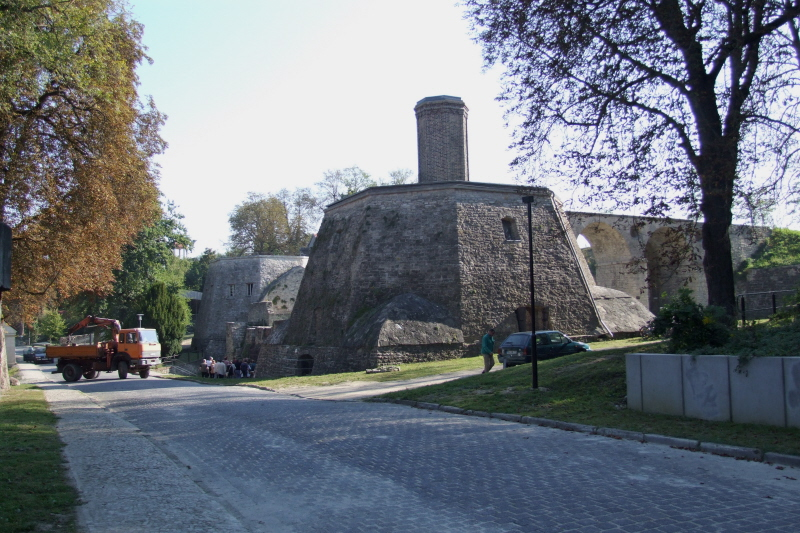
A Rumford furnace at the Rüdersdorf Museum Park near Berlin

A Rumford furnace is a kiln for the industrial scale production in the 19th century of calcium oxide, popularly known as quicklime or burnt lime. It was named after its inventor, Benjamin Thompson, also known as Count Rumford, and is sometimes called a Rüdersdorf furnace after the location where it was first built and from where the design rapidly spread throughout Europe.

== Technology ==
Rumford's innovation was to separate the combustion chambers for the limestone and the fuel. In previous designs, the fuel (traditionally wood or charcoal, later coal) was mixed with the limestone before burning, which meant that the quicklime end product was contaminated with ash and had to be laboriously cleaned. By separating the two it was possible to produce large quantities of high-quality quicklime for the booming 19th-century European construction industry.

In a Rumford furnace, fuel compartments surround the actual combustion chamber, each one being connected to it by a single transverse channel through which the hot air produced by the burning fuel flows into the stack and moves upward through the pile of limestone. The fuel ash waste falls into a separate chamber, from which it can be removed. The limestone in the central shaft collapses as it burns to quicklime, making space for new limestone to be added to the top of the stack. The quicklime cools down as it slowly descends through the space below the channel connecting the stack to the firing compartment and is finally removed through an outlet at the bottom of the shaft. The upper part of the limestone shaft extends above the fuel compartments and its walls contain separate cavities filled with coal dust. This insulation supports the prewarming of the limestone before it moves into the vicinity of the hot air source.

== Historical development ==
The first Rumford kiln was constructed in 1802 in Rüdersdorf near Berlin, and one of them can still be explored at the Museumspark Rüdersdorf. The innovation rapidly spread throughout Europe because it made it possible to produce quicklime far more efficiently than predecessor technologies. These required either batch production, waiting for each load to be assembled, burn and cool before removal, or carefully mixing the fuel and limestone in the appropriate proportions, burning them together, and then cleaning the contaminated limestone afterward. In a Rumford kiln continuous operation was possible for the first time, since the addition of fuel and limestone as well as the removal of ash and quicklime could be separately optimized according to need, and all these operations could take place simultaneously.
