= Orlov (crater) =

Crater on the Moon

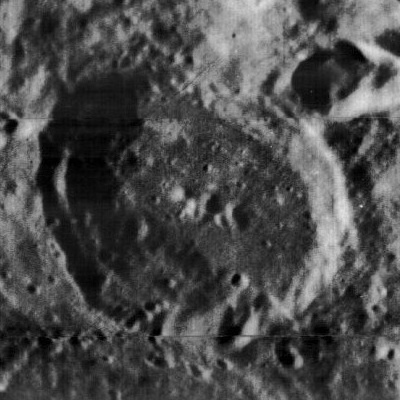
- Lunar Orbiter 1 image
- Coordinates: 25.7°S 175.0°W
- Diameter: 81 km
- Depth: Unknown
- Colongitude: 184° at sunrise
- Formation: Nectarian
- Eponym: Aleksandr I. Orlov; Sergei V. Orlov

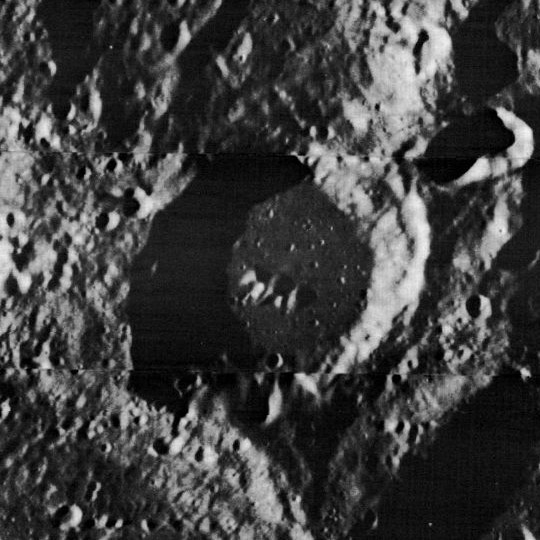
Lunar Orbiter 2 image

Orlov is a lunar impact crater located on the Moon's far side, to the northeast of the larger crater Leeuwenhoek. To the north-northwest of Orlov is De Vries, and to the east-southeast is Rumford.

On the lunar geologic timescale, Orlov dates to the Nectarian period. This crater lies between two larger satellite craters. Orlov Y is attached to the northern rim, and Leeuwenhoek E is connected along the southwest. The latter is also the location of an outward bulge in the rim of Orlov, giving it a wider interior wall along that side. There is some terracing along the eastern inner wall of Orlov. Orlov D, an oval-shaped crater, is attached to the outer rim along the northeast.

The interior floor of Orlov is relatively level with a central ridge formation located near the midpoint. The spectra of this peak fits an olivine-bearing gabbroic norite mineralogy, which originated from a depth of 8.1 to 12.8 km. There are some small craters along the extended inner wall to the southwest.

== Satellite craters ==
By convention these features are identified on lunar maps by placing the letter on the side of the crater midpoint that is closest to Orlov.

Orlov	Latitude	Longitude	Diameter
D	24.8° S	173.4° W	27 km
Y	22.8° S	175.1° W	126 km

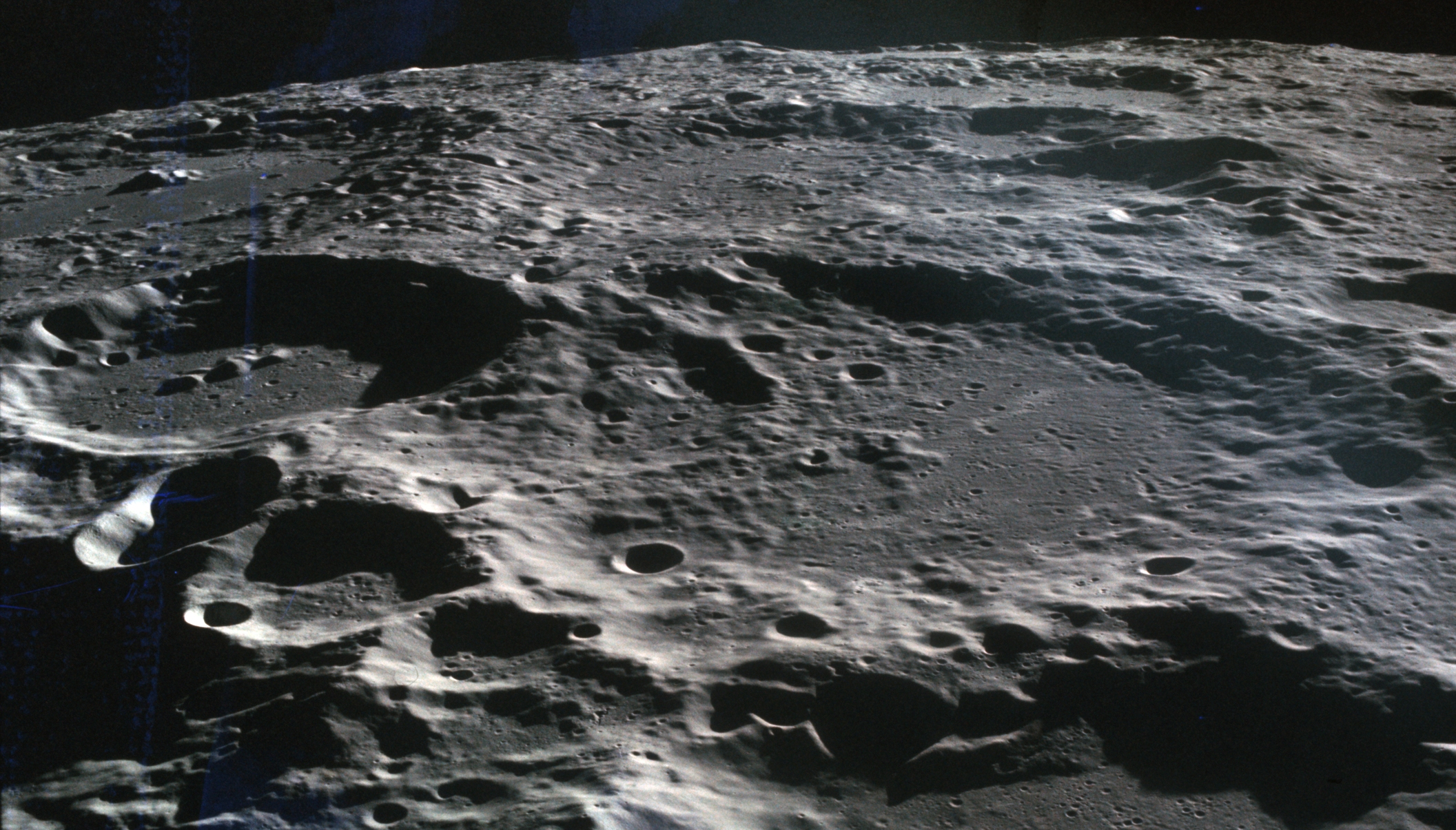
Oblique view of Orlov at left and Orlov Y at right, with Leeuwenhoek in left background. Facing southwest. Apollo 17 image.
