= Davisson (crater) =

Crater on the Moon

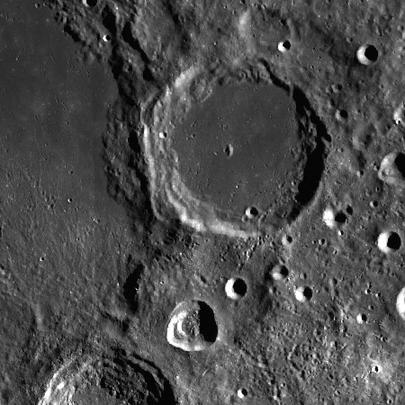
- LRO image
- Coordinates: 37.5°S 174.6°W
- Diameter: 92.46 km (57.45 mi)
- Depth: Unknown
- Colongitude: 177° at sunrise
- Formation: Nectarian
- Eponym: Clinton J. Davisson

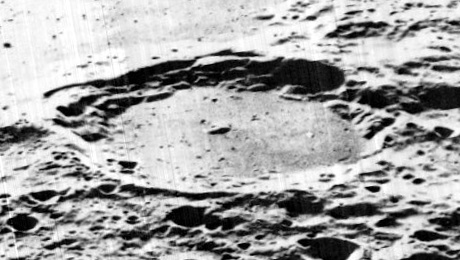
Oblique Lunar Orbiter 5 image

Davisson is a lunar impact crater that is located on the far side of the Moon from the Earth. This crater lies across the eastern rim of the huge walled plain named Leibnitz, and the rim and outer rampart intrudes into the interior floor of Leibnitz. To the east-northeast of Davisson is the walled plain Oppenheimer, a formation only somewhat smaller than Leibnitz.

On the lunar geologic timescale, this formation dates to the Nectarian period. The rim of Davisson has been somewhat eroded from impacts, but it retains some detail from its original formation. Particularly along the western face, the interior wall displays some terraces. The rim is more worn along the northeastern face, and the rim is more irregular to the north and south. The interior floor is covered by basalt, and is relatively level and featureless. There is a low central peak offset slightly to the southwest of the crater midpoint. The spectra of this peak fits a peridotite mineralogy, which was excavated from a depth of 8.7 to 13.8 km.

This crater is named after Clinton Joseph Davisson (1881–1958), a US physicist who in 1927 made the first experimental observation of the wave-like nature of electrons. For this work, he shared the Nobel Prize for Physics in 1937. Prior to its name being formally adopted in 1970 by the International Astronomical Union, this crater was known as Crater 377.
