= Rumford's Soup =

Nutritional mixture

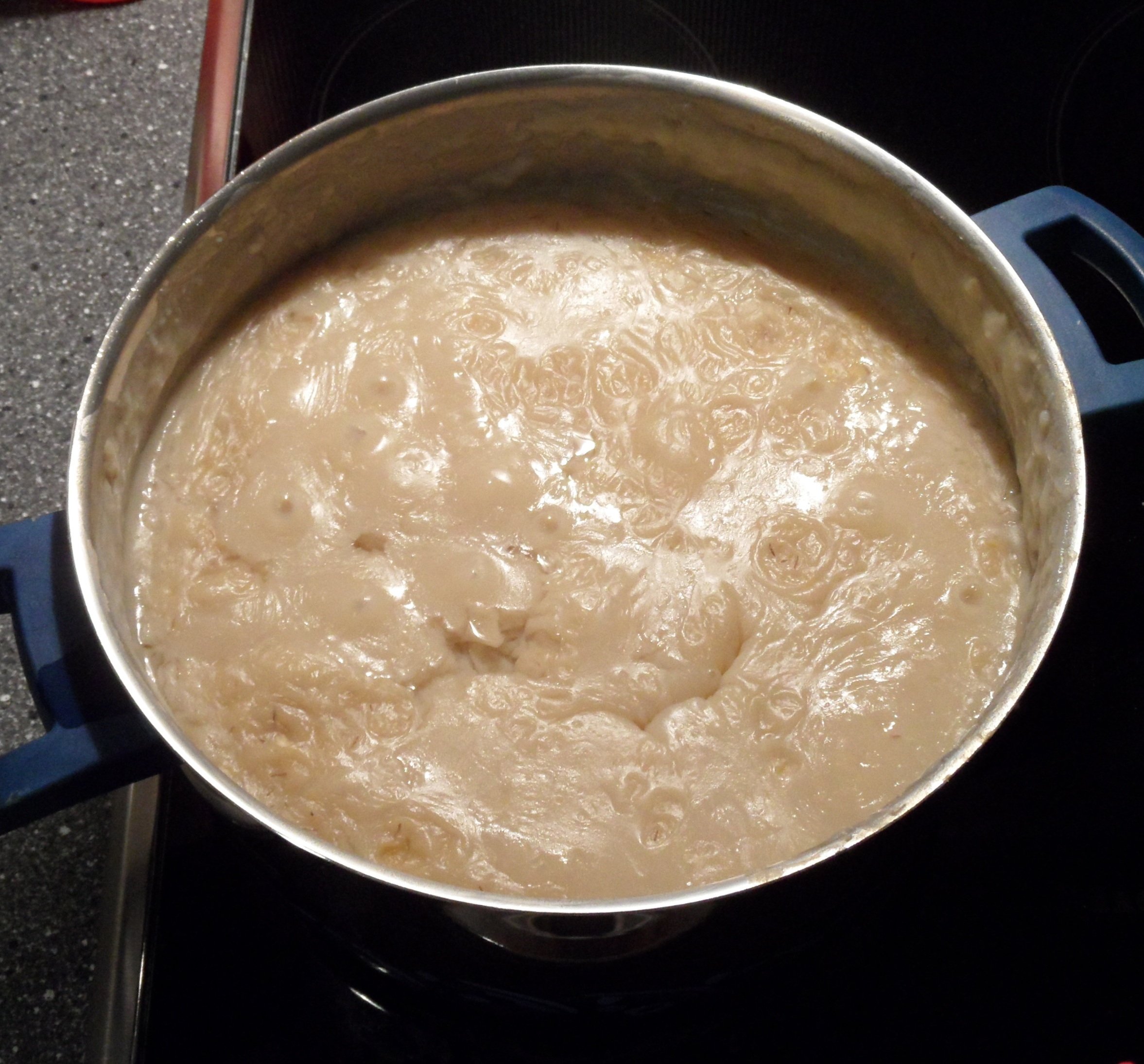
- A pot of Rumford’s Soup according to the most basic recipe: pearl barley and dried peas, water, salt and some vinegar. This version has no potatoes.
- Type: Soup
- Region or state: Munich and Bavaria
- Created by: Benjamin Thompson
- Main ingredients: Pearl barley, dried yellow peas, potatoes, beer

Rumford's Soup (Rumfordsche Suppe, also called economy soup) was an early effort in scientific nutrition. It was invented by Benjamin Thompson, Reichsgraf von Rumford, circa 1800 and consumed in Munich and greater Bavaria, where he was employed as an advisor to Charles Theodore, Elector of Bavaria. It was used as a ration for the poor, for Bavarian workhouses and military workhouses, and prisoners. Count Rumford has been credited in many instances for "establishing the first real soup kitchen."

As a reformatory measure, the Bavarian government intended to institute workhouses for those on welfare. Rumford's charge was to provide the cheapest possible ration that was still a high-calorie, nutritious food. The soup came to be well known among philanthropic-minded people throughout Germany at the time, and Rumford set up his soup kitchens in many German cities.

Rumford's soup was a common base for inexpensive military rations in Central Europe for much of the nineteenth and twentieth century.

== Ingredients ==
Rumford's soup contained equal parts of pearl barley or barley meal and dried peas, vegetables, four parts potato, salt according to need, and sour beer, slowly boiled until thick. The use of potatoes came into use in later versions of the soup. It was typically eaten with bread. It has been stated that Rumford's recipe called for the bread to be served uncooked, and "added just before serving the soup." One account describes the soup as being poured atop the bread just prior to serving. Rumford noted that the barley served to significantly thicken the soup and provide a richness to it, and he considered the cereal grain as "the rice of Great Britain." Some versions were composed of cereals, minor amounts of meat and other ingredients.

== Nutrition ==
Rumford's Soup was designed to provide a high degree of nutrition at minimal expense. It has been estimated that the soup provided one-third of a person's minimal (daily) nutritional requirements. Rumford's soup is naturally low-fat, with high protein content from the dried peas, and both complex carbohydrates from the potato and barley and simple carbohydrates from the beer. Given the knowledge of the day, it was close to an optimum solution to the problem of creating cheap, nutritious food. At the time, the need for vitamins and trace elements was unknown, but Rumford's soup was sometimes supplemented with corn or herring which supplied adequate vitamin C and vitamin D.

== In popular culture ==
The soup is occasionally served today to illustrate the past, such as at the "Oide Wiesn" historical section of the Oktoberfest celebrations in Munich, meant to recreate Oktoberfest in the "olden days".

== See also ==
- List of soups
- List of German soups
- Peasant food
