= Oppenheimer (crater) =

Lunar impact crater

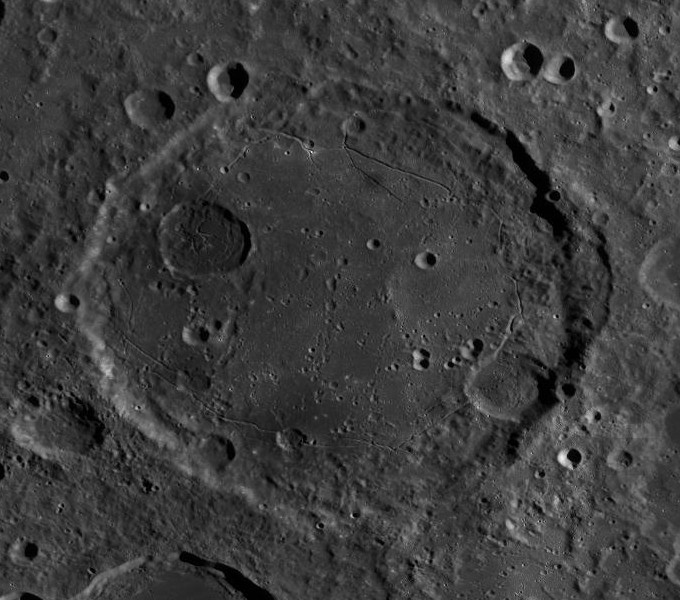
- Mosaic of LRO WAC images
- Coordinates: 35.2°S 166.3°W
- Diameter: 208 km
- Depth: Unknown
- Colongitude: 170° at sunrise
- Eponym: J. Robert Oppenheimer

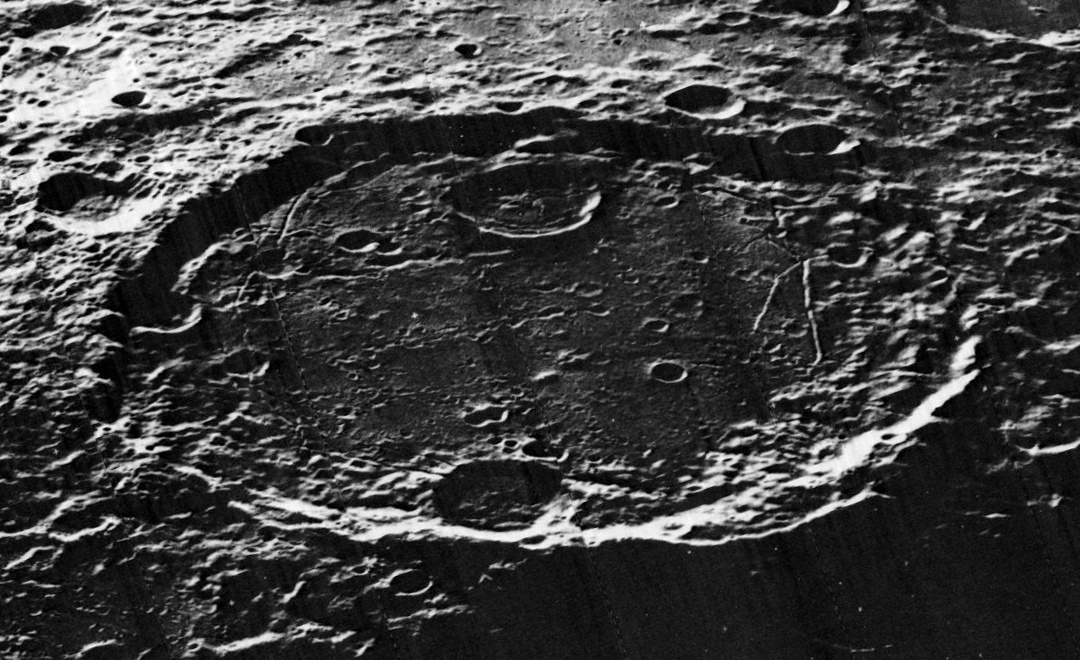
Oblique Lunar Orbiter 5 image

Oppenheimer is a large lunar impact crater that lies on the far side of the Moon. It lies along the western outer rampart of an immense walled plain named Apollo. Nearby features of note include the dark-floored crater Maksutov to the southwest, and Davisson to the west-southwest. The latter intrudes into the eastern rim of Leibnitz, a feature about 20% larger than Oppenheimer.

This formation dates to the Nectarian period of the lunar geologic timescale. The outer rim of Oppenheimer is very nearly circular, but is broken in several locations by small craters. The most prominent of these is Oppenheimer H, lying against the inner wall and rim. In general the inner wall is unusually narrow along the western rim, but is much wider in the eastern half near where the rim approaches the Apollo basin.

The interior floor is relatively level, particularly near the center. This floor has a lower albedo in several patches near the western rim. One of these patches contains the flooded crater Oppenheimer U. Near the northern and southern inner walls is a system of linear rilles in the surface. The far eastern half of the crater is marked by a ray system running north–south.

Prior to formal naming in 1970 by the IAU, the crater was known as Crater 382.

== Satellite craters ==
By convention these features are identified on lunar maps by placing the letter on the side of the crater midpoint that is closest to Oppenheimer.

Oppenheimer	Latitude	Longitude	Diameter
F	34.7° S	161.5° W	35 km
H	36.5° S	163.1° W	33 km
R	37.3° S	170.4° W	26 km
U	34.3° S	167.9° W	38 km
V	32.0° S	172.7° W	32 km
W	32.1° S	169.0° W	20 km
