= Benjamin Thompson =

British military officer, scientist and inventor

Gracious Lord Count Rumford FRS
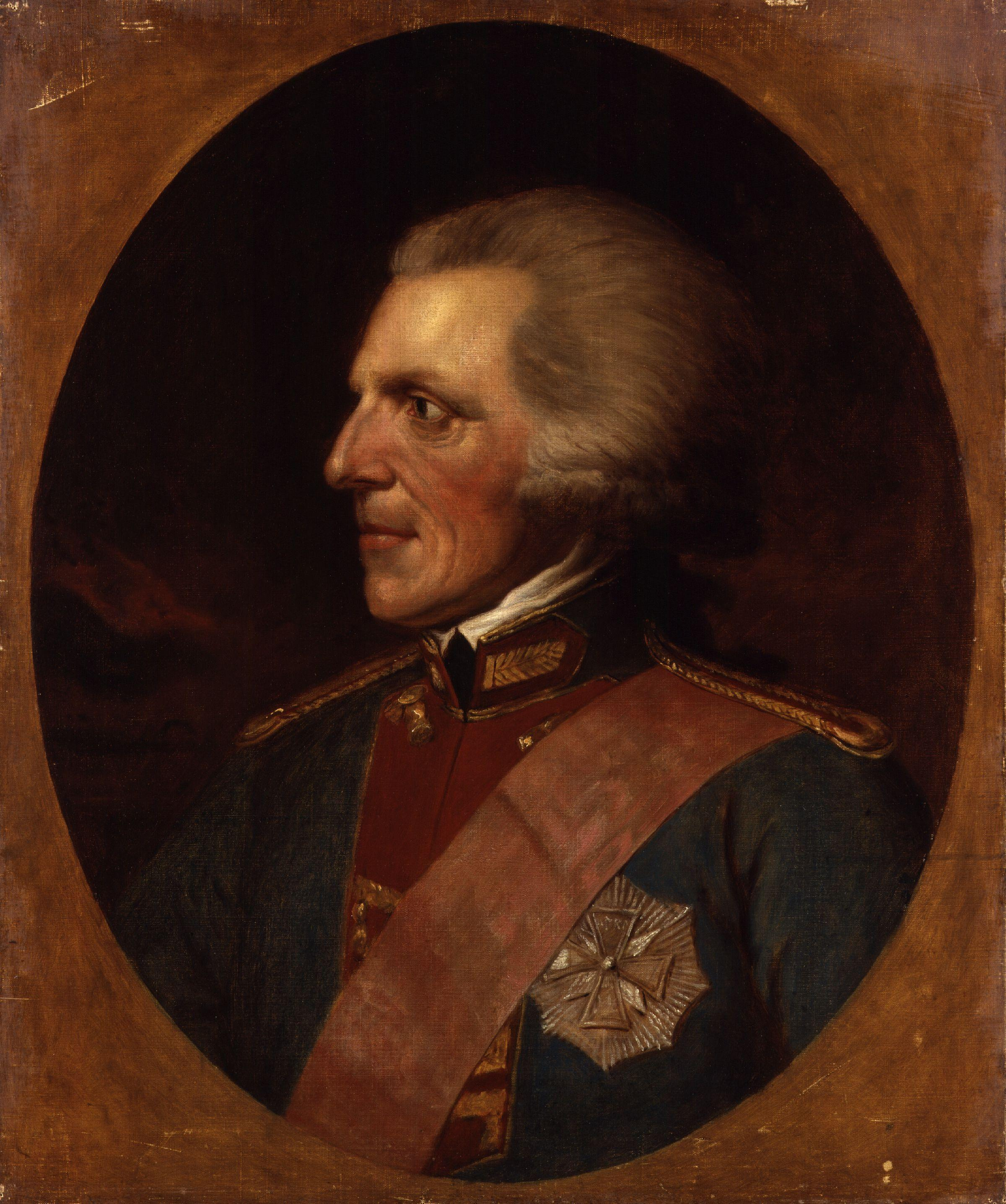
- Portrait by Moritz Kellerhoven, 1792
- Born: Benjamin Thompson; 26 March 1753; Woburn, Province of Massachusetts Bay, British America
- Died: 21 August 1814 (aged 61); Auteuil, Paris, France
- Known for: Thermodynamics
- Awards: Copley Medal (1792); Rumford Medal (1800)
- Scientific career
- Fields: Physics

Colonel Sir Benjamin Thompson, Count Rumford, FRS (26 March 1753 – 21 August 1814), was an American-born British military officer, scientist and inventor. Born in Woburn, Massachusetts, he supported the Loyalist cause during the American War of Independence, commanding the King's American Dragoons during the conflict. After the war ended in 1783, Thompson moved to London, where he was recognised for his administrative talents and received a knighthood from George III in 1784.

A prolific scientist and inventor, Thompson also created several new warship designs. He subsequently moved to the Electorate of Bavaria and entered into the employ of the Bavarian government, heavily reorganising the Bavarian Army. Thompson was rewarded for his efforts by being made an Imperial Count in 1792 before dying in Paris in 1814.

== Early years ==
Coat of Arms of Benjamin Thompson

Thompson was born in rural Woburn, in the Province of Massachusetts Bay, on 26 March 1753; his birthplace is preserved as a museum. He was educated mainly at the village school, although he sometimes walked almost ten miles to Cambridge with the older Loammi Baldwin to attend lectures by Professor John Winthrop of Harvard College. At the age of 13 he was apprenticed to John Appleton, a merchant of nearby Salem. Thompson excelled at his trade, and coming in contact with refined and well educated people for the first time, adopted many of their characteristics including an interest in science. While recuperating in Woburn in 1769 from an injury, Thompson conducted his first experiments studying the nature of heat and began to correspond with Baldwin and others about them. Later that year he worked several months for a Boston shopkeeper and then apprenticed himself briefly, and unsuccessfully, to a doctor in Woburn.

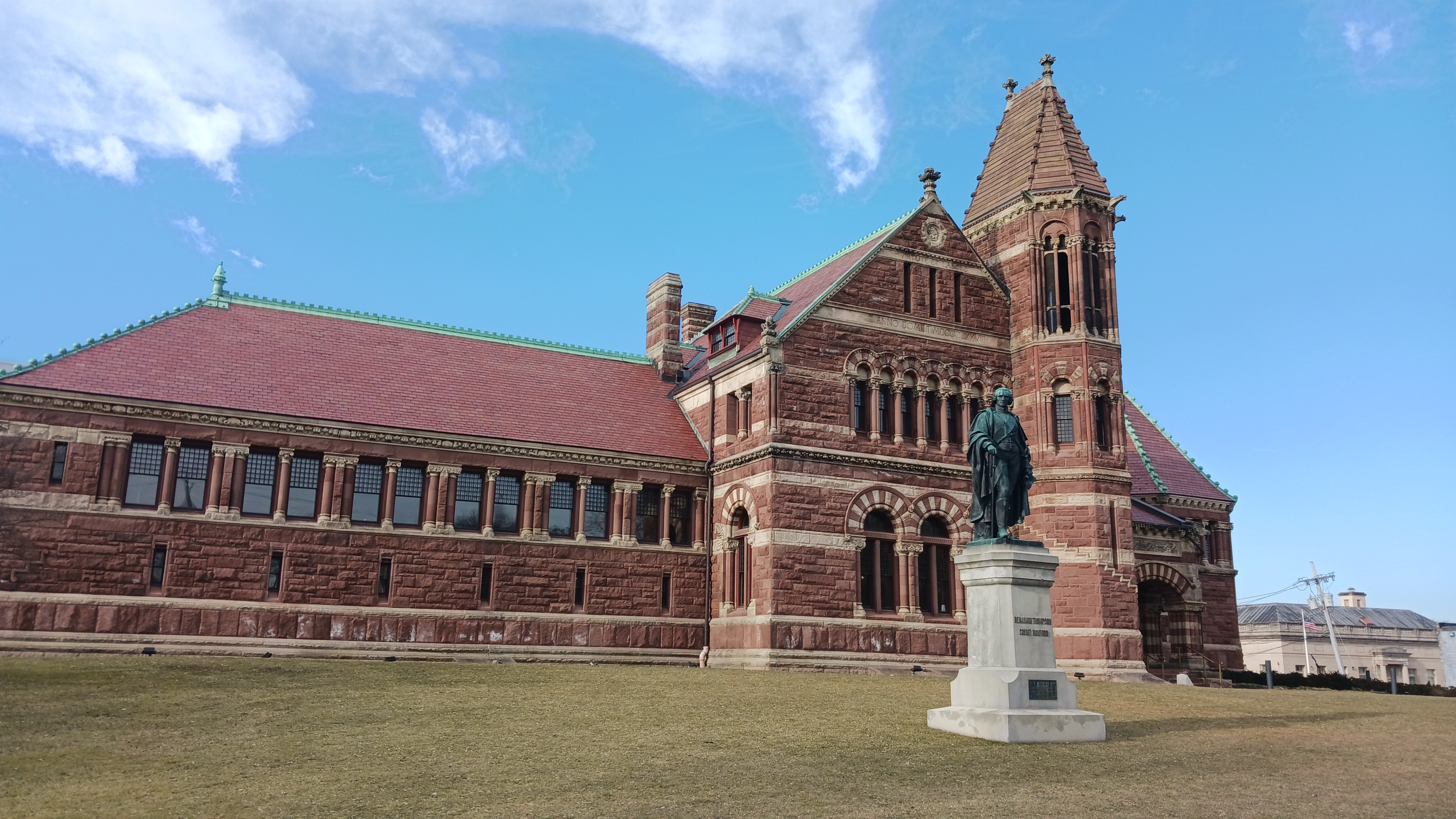
Statue of Benjamin Thompson in Woburn Massachusetts

Thompson's prospects were dim in 1772 but in that year they changed abruptly. He met, charmed and married a rich and well-connected widow, an heiress named Sarah Rolfe (née Walker). Her father was a minister, and her late husband left her property at Rumford, Province of New Hampshire, which is today in the modern city of Concord. They moved to Portsmouth, and through his wife's influence with the governor, he was appointed a major in the New Hampshire Militia. Their child (also named Sarah) was born in 1774.

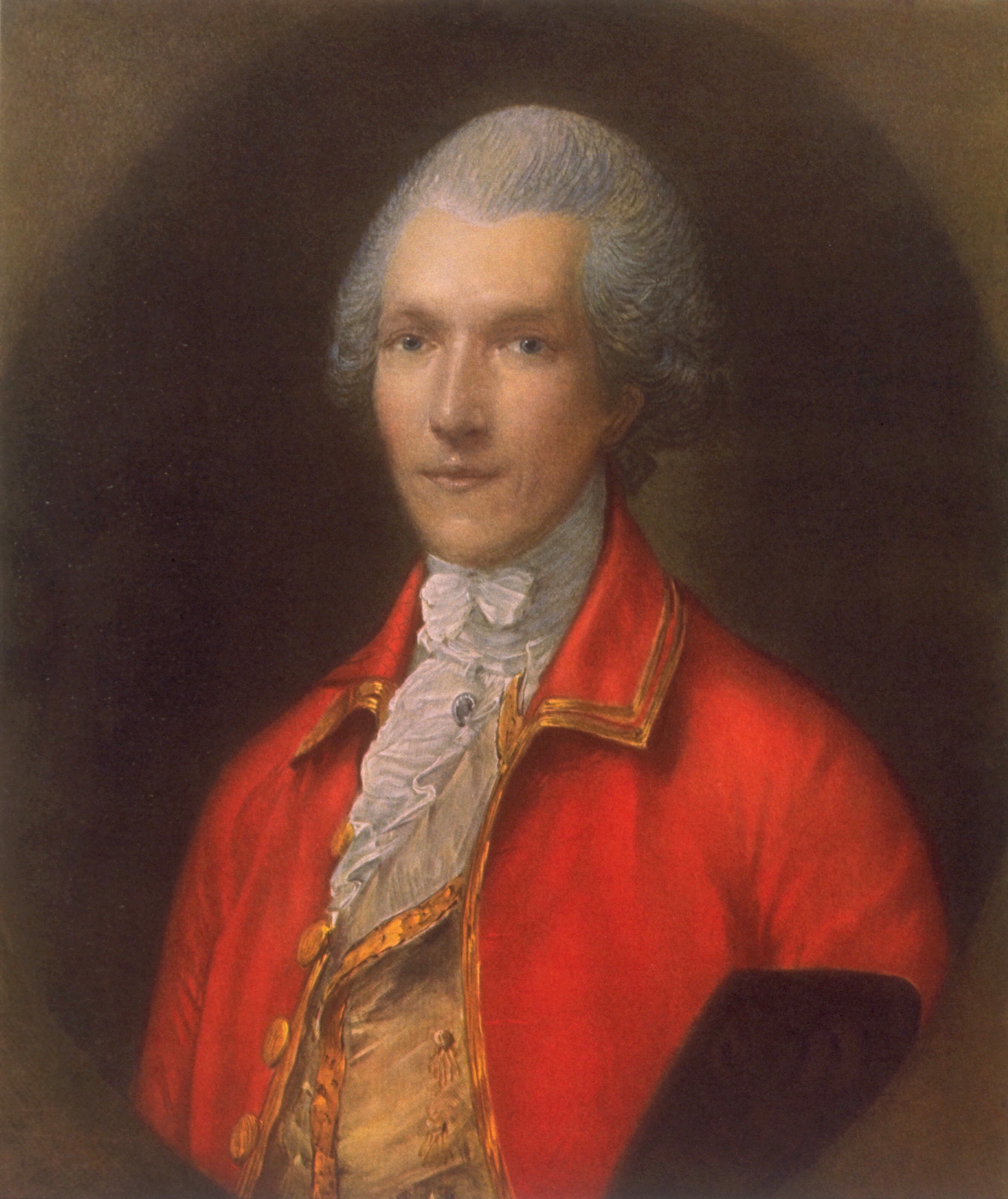
Painting by Thomas Gainsborough 1783

== American Revolutionary War ==
Following the outbreak of the American Revolutionary War in 1775, Thompson, by now a wealthy and influential landowner, came out as a Loyalist. He was soon using his connections in the colonial militia to recruit and arm Loyalists seeking to fight alongside the British against rebel forces, which earned him the enmity of Patriots in New Hampshire. Thompson was stripped of his militia commission and a Patriot mob attacked and burned down his house, causing him to flee to British lines, abandoning his wife in the process. He became a political and military advisor to General Thomas Gage (to whom Thompson was already passing information on Patriots), and later assisted Lord George Germain in organizing and provisioning Loyalist military units.

In 1781, Thompson raised his own military unit, the King's American Dragoons, which was primarily stationed on Long Island in 1782 and early 1783, where they became notorious for demolishing a church and burial ground in order to erect Fort Golgotha in Huntington, New York.

== England ==
"By 1775 Thompson had sailed for England, where under the auspices of the Secretary for the Colonies Lord George Germain he rose very rapidly in the service of the British government."

During his military career, Thompson conducted experiments to measure the force of gunpowder, the results of which were widely acclaimed when published in 1781 in the Philosophical Transactions of the Royal Society.

In 1779, he was elected a Fellow of the Royal Society In 1780 Thompson was appointed as Under-Secretary of the Northern Department in the British Government. But he left abruptly in the following year and traveled to North America as Lieutenant Colonel of the King's American Dragoons. When the American Revolutionary War came to an end, he returned to England and successfully applied to become full colonel. In 1783 he had a portrait painted of himself by Thomas Gainsborough, which is now on display in the Fogg Art Museum. On 23 February 1784, George III conferred upon him the honor of knighthood.

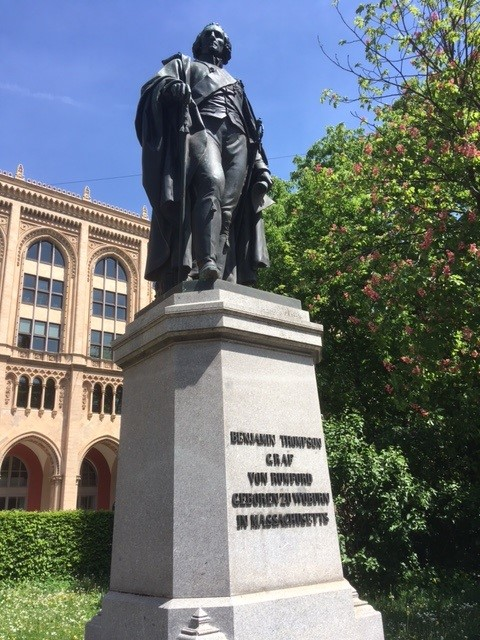
Thompson in Munich

In 1799, the Royal Institution was founded as the result of a proposal by Thompson, for the "formation by Subscription, in the Metropolis of the British Empire, of a Public Institution for diffusing the Knowledge and facilitating the general Introduction of useful Mechanical Inventions and Improvements, and for the teaching by courses of Philosophical Lectures and Experiments, the application of Science to the Common Purposes of Life".

== Bavarian maturity ==
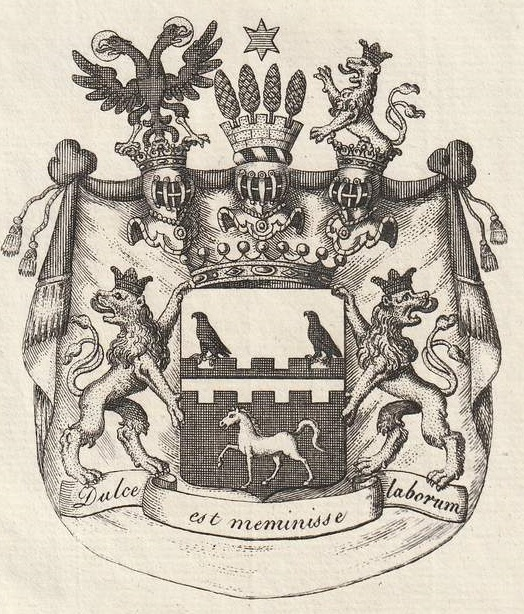
Thompson's arms as Reichsgraf von Rumford

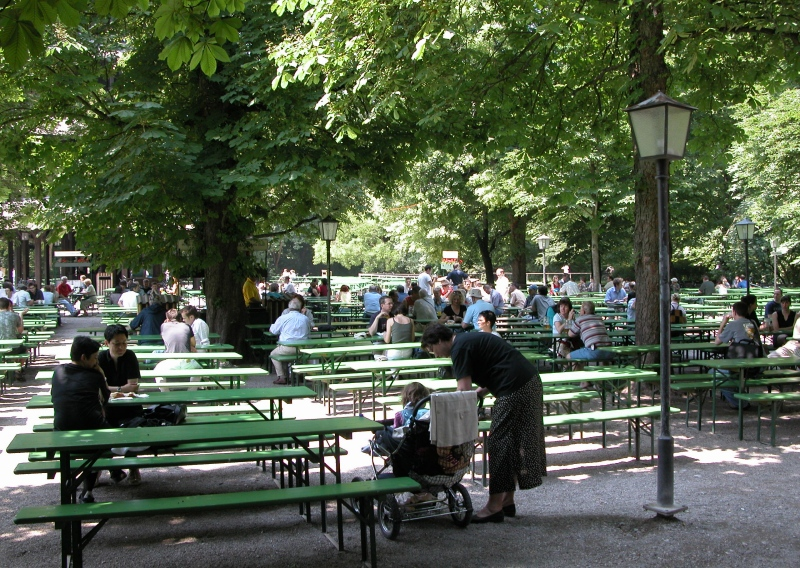
The beer garden "Am chinesischen Turm" in the Englischer Garten in Munich

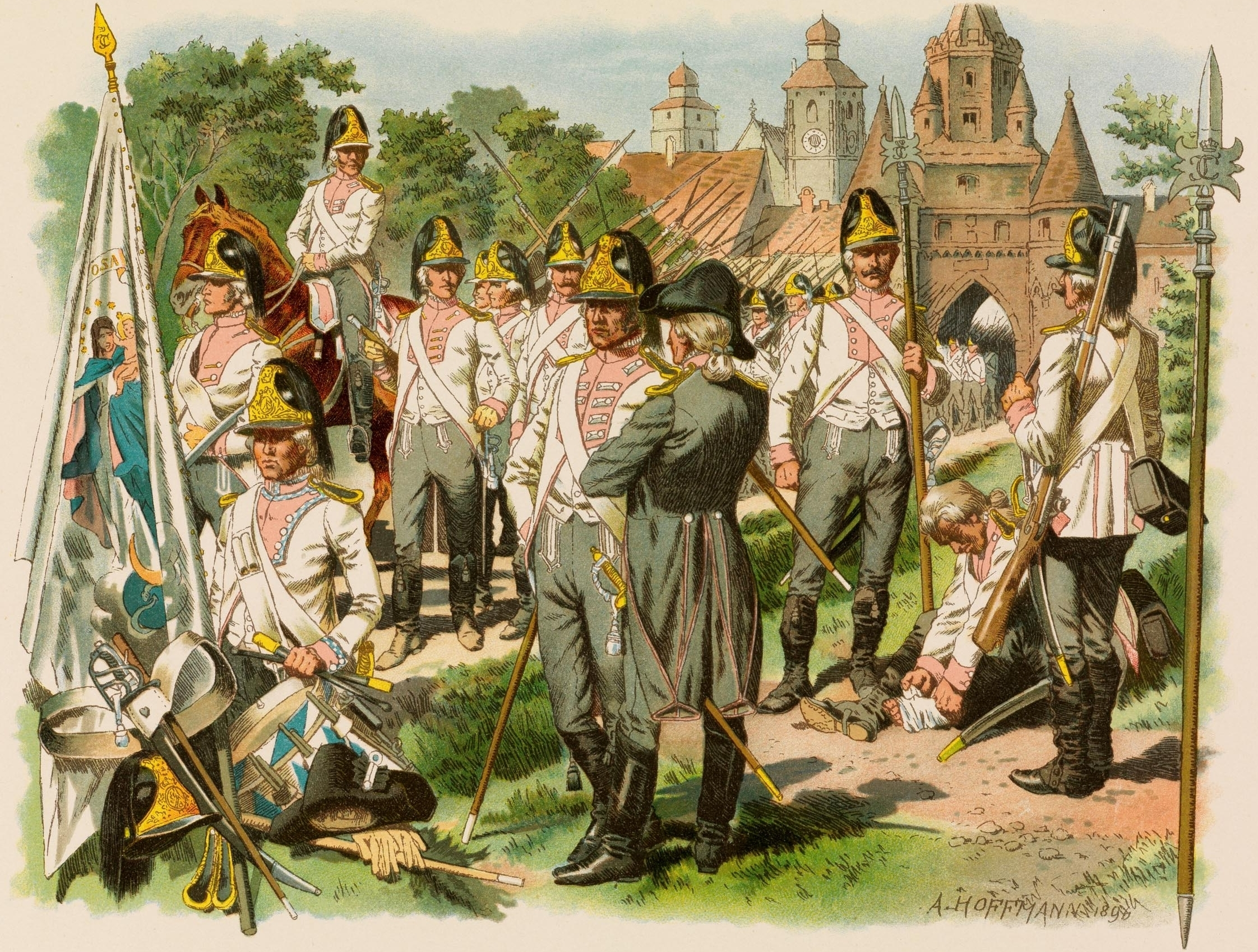
Bavarian uniforms designed by Benjamin Thompson, also known in Bavaria as Reichsgraf von Rumford

In 1785, he moved to Bavaria where he became an aide-de-camp to the Prince-elector Charles Theodore. He spent eleven years in Bavaria, reorganizing the army and establishing workhouses for the poor. He also invented Rumford's Soup, a soup for the poor, and established the cultivation of the potato in Bavaria. He studied methods of cooking, heating, and lighting, including the relative costs and efficiencies of wax candles, tallow candles, and oil lamps. On Prince Charles' behalf he created the Englischer Garten in Munich in 1789; it remains today and is known as one of the largest urban public parks in the world. He was elected a Foreign Honorary Member of the American Academy of Arts and Sciences in 1789.

For his efforts, in 1791 Thompson was made an Imperial Count, becoming Reichsgraf von Rumford. He took the name "Rumford" after the town of Rumford, New Hampshire, which was an older name for Concord where he had been married.

== Science and engineering ==
Benjamin Thompson has many claims on the interest of the historian of science. He founded the Royal Institution. His methods of conservation of heat and economy of fuel, his designs of stoves, fireplaces and cooking utensils were widely used during his lifetime. He was consulted on the laying out of kitchens in hospitals and institutions. He taught his contemporaries to recognise the fire built on an open hearth, the only means of domestic heating and cooking with which they were acquainted, for the ineffective and wasteful contrivance it really was. He held the most enlightened views, far in advance of his time, on the waste of fuel and the evils of atmospheric pollution in cities. Rumford's constant preoccupation was the application of scientific principles to the improvement of the lot of the poor and the working classes, and it was in the subject of heat and its utilization that he found the greatest outlet for his endeavours.

— Thomas Martin, The Experimental Researches of Benjamin Thompson, Count Rumford

=== Experiments on heat ===
His experiments on gunnery and explosives led to an interest in heat. He devised a method for measuring the specific heat of a solid substance but was disappointed when Johan Wilcke published his parallel discovery first.

Thompson next investigated the insulating properties of various materials, including fur, wool and feathers. He correctly deduced that the insulating properties of these natural materials arise from the fact that they inhibit the convection of air. He then inferred — incorrectly — that air and, in fact, all gases, were perfect non-conductors of heat. He further saw this as evidence of the argument from design, contending that divine providence had arranged for fur on animals in such a way as to guarantee their comfort.

In 1797, he extended his claim about non-conductivity to liquids. The idea raised considerable objections from the scientific establishment, John Dalton and John Leslie making particularly forthright attacks. Instrumentation far exceeding anything available in terms of accuracy and precision would have been needed to verify Thompson's claim. Again, he seems to have been influenced by his theological beliefs, and historian of science D. S. L. Cardwell speculated that Thompson wished to grant water a privileged and providential status in the regulation of human life.

He is considered the founder of the sous-vide food preparation method owing to his experiment with a mutton shoulder. He described this method in one of his essays.

=== Mechanical equivalent of heat ===
Rumford's most important scientific work took place in Munich, and centred on the nature of heat, which he contended in "An Inquiry Concerning the Source of the Heat Which Is Excited by Friction" (1798) was not the caloric of then-current scientific thinking but a form of motion. Rumford had observed the frictional heat generated by boring cannon at the arsenal in Munich. Rumford immersed a cannon barrel in water and arranged for a specially blunted boring tool. He showed that the water could be boiled within roughly two and a half hours and that the supply of frictional heat was seemingly inexhaustible. Rumford confirmed that no physical change had taken place in the material of the cannon by comparing the specific heats of the material machined away and that remaining.

Rumford argued that the seemingly indefinite generation of heat was incompatible with the caloric theory. He contended that the only thing communicated to the barrel was motion.

Rumford made no attempt to further quantify the heat generated or to measure the mechanical equivalent of heat. Though this work met with a hostile reception, it was subsequently important in establishing the laws of conservation of energy later in the 19th century.

=== Calorific and frigorific radiation ===
He explained Pictet's experiment, which demonstrates the reflection of cold, by supposing that all bodies emit invisible rays, undulations in the ethereal fluid. He did experiments to support his theories of calorific and frigorific radiation and said the communication of heat was the net effect of calorific (hot) rays and frigorific (cold) rays and the rays emitted by the object. When an object absorbs radiation from a warmer object (calorific rays) its temperature rises, and when it absorbs radiation from a colder object (frigorific rays) its temperature falls. See note 8, "An enquiry concerning the nature of heat and the mode of its communication" Philosophical Transactions of the Royal Society, starting at page 112.

=== Inventions and design improvements ===
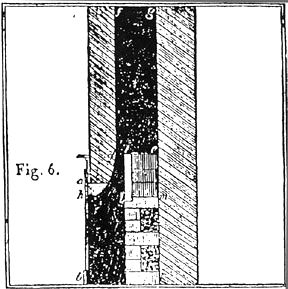
Section of Rumford fireplace

Thompson was an active and prolific inventor, developing improvements for chimneys, fireplaces and industrial furnaces, as well as inventing a double boiler, a kitchen range, and a coffee drip-press pot roughly between 1810 and 1814. He invented a percolating coffee pot following his pioneering work with the Bavarian Army, where he improved the diet of the soldiers (Rumford's Soup) as well as their clothes.

The Rumford fireplace created a sensation in London when he introduced the idea of restricting the chimney opening to increase the updraught, which was a much more efficient way to heat a room than earlier fireplaces. He and his workers modified fireplaces by inserting bricks into the hearth to make the side walls angled, and added a choke to the chimney to increase the speed of air going up the flue. The effect was to produce a streamlined air flow, so all the smoke would go up into the chimney rather than lingering and entering the room. It also had the effect of increasing the efficiency of the fire, and gave extra control of the rate of combustion of the fuel, whether wood or coal. Many fashionable London houses were modified to his instructions, and became smoke-free. Thomas Jefferson used the Rumford fireplace design at Monticello.

Thompson became a celebrity when news of his success spread. His work was also very profitable, and much imitated when he published his analysis of the way chimneys worked. In many ways, he was similar to Benjamin Franklin, who also invented a new kind of heating stove.

The retention of heat was a recurring theme in his work, as he is also credited with the invention of thermal underwear.

=== Industrial furnaces ===
Cross section of a Rumford furnace, with the fuel chamber at the left

Thompson also significantly improved the design of kilns used to produce quicklime, and Rumford furnaces were soon being constructed throughout Europe. The key innovation involved separating the burning fuel from the limestone, so that the lime produced by the heat of the furnace was not contaminated by ash from the fire.

=== Light and photometry ===
Rumford worked in photometry, the measurement of light. He made a photometer and introduced the standard candle, the predecessor of the candela, as a unit of luminous intensity. His standard candle was made from the oil of a sperm whale, to rigid specifications. He also published studies of "illusory" or subjective complementary colours, induced by the shadows created by two lights, one white and one coloured; these observations were cited and generalized by Michel-Eugène Chevreul as his "law of simultaneous colour contrast" in 1839.

== Later life ==
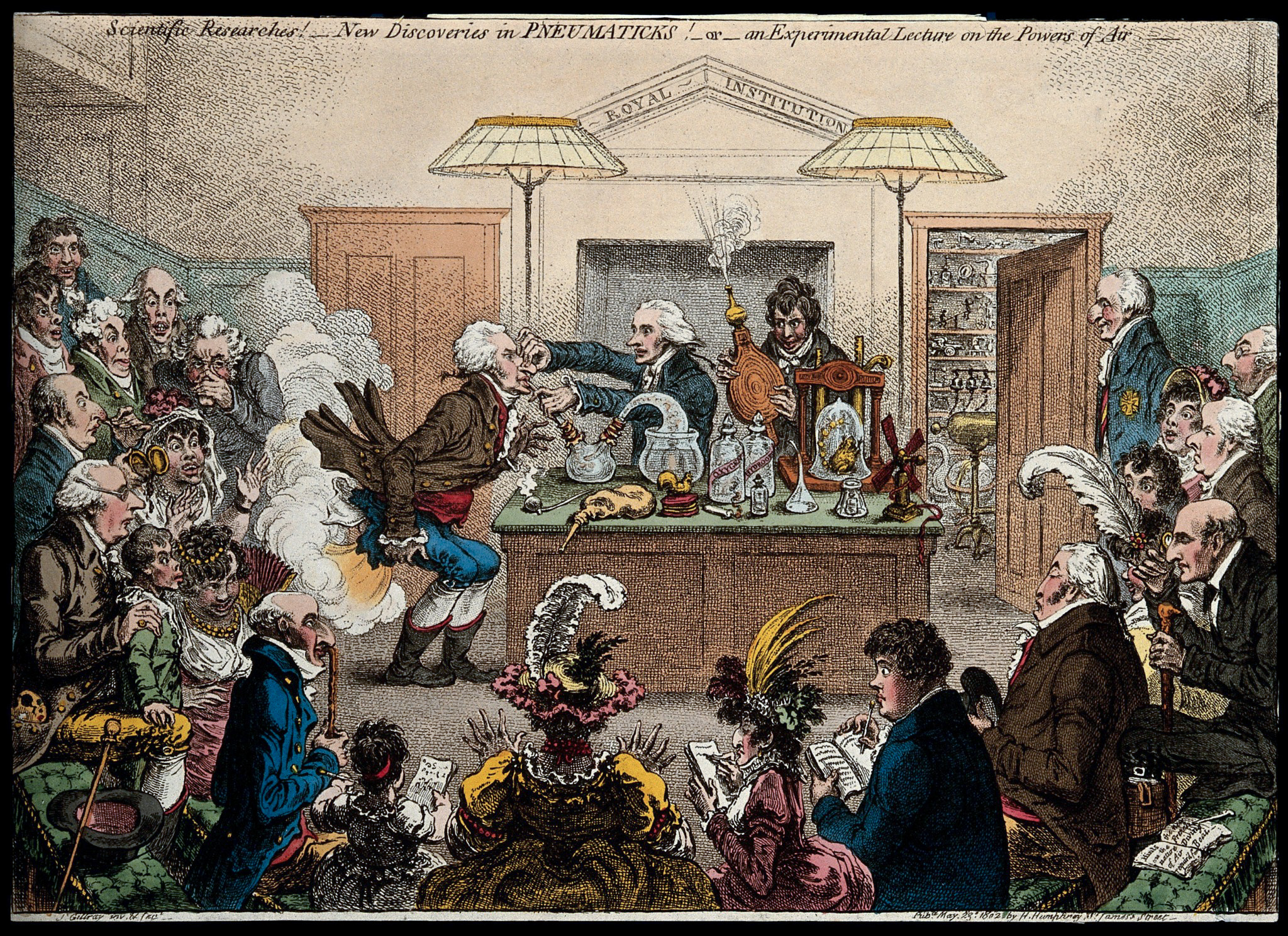
Satirical cartoon by James Gillray showing a Royal Institution lecture on pneumatics with Davy holding the bellows and Count Rumford looking on at extreme right. Dr Garnett is the lecturer holding the victim's nose.

After 1799, he divided his time between France and England. With Sir Joseph Banks, he established the Royal Institution of Great Britain in 1799. The pair chose Sir Humphry Davy as the first lecturer. The institution flourished and became world-famous as a result of Davy's pioneering research. His assistant, Michael Faraday, established the Institution as a premier research laboratory, and also justly famous for its series of public lectures popularizing science. That tradition continues to the present, and the Royal Institution Christmas lectures attract large audiences through their TV broadcasts.

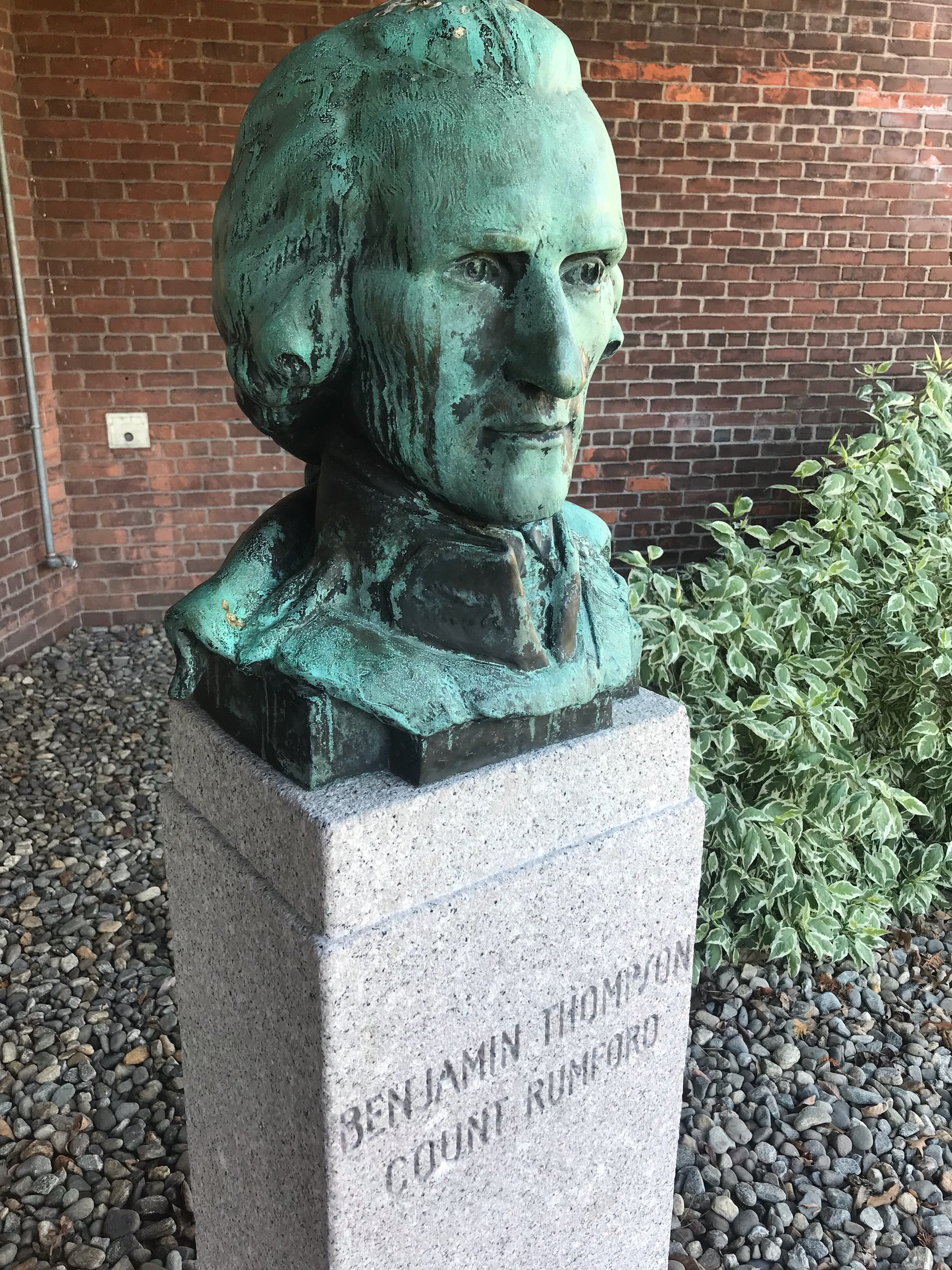
A bust of Benjamin Thompson, Count Rumford, in Rumford, Rhode Island.

Thompson endowed the Rumford medals of the Royal Society and the American Academy of Arts and Sciences, and endowed the Rumford Chair of Physics at Harvard University. In 1803, he was elected a foreign member of the Royal Swedish Academy of Sciences, and as a member of the American Philosophical Society.

== Personal life ==
In 1772, Thompson married a rich and well-connected widow, an heiress named Sarah Rolfe (née Walker). Her father was a minister, and her late husband left her property at Rumford, Province of New Hampshire, which is today in the modern city of Concord. They moved to Portsmouth, and through his wife's influence with the governor, he was appointed a major in the New Hampshire Militia. Their child (also named Sarah) was born in 1774. Thompson abandoned his American wife, Sarah, at the outbreak of the American Revolution; she died in 1792.

After several affairs and a close friendship with Lady Emily (Amelia) Mary Lamb Temple (21 April 1787...11 September 1869), Viscountess Palmerston,(born Mary Mee), in 1804, he married Marie-Anne Lavoisier, the widow of the great French chemist Antoine Lavoisier. Thompson separated from his second wife after three years, but he settled in Paris and continued his scientific work until his death on 21 August 1814. Thompson is buried in the small cemetery of Auteuil in Paris, just across from Adrien-Marie Legendre. Upon his death, his daughter from his first marriage, Sarah Thompson, inherited his title as Countess Rumford.

Some periodicals and satirical publications of Rumford’s time made references that associated him with men who were publicly linked to homosexuality, notably George Germain, 1st Viscount Sackville.. Rumford’s surviving letters and papers do not contain evidence of same-sex relationships, and no independent contemporary documentation corroborates the claims.

== Honours ==
- Colonel, King's American Dragoons.
- Knighted, 1784.
- Count of the Holy Roman Empire, 1791.
- The crater Rumford on the Moon is named after him.
- Rumford baking powder (patented 1859) is named after him, having been invented by a former Rumford professor at Harvard University, Eben Norton Horsford (1818–1893), cofounder of the Rumford Chemical Works of East Providence, RI.
- Rumford Kitchen at the World's Fair in Chicago, 1893.
- A street in the inner city of Munich is named after him.
- Rumford Street (and the nearby Rumford Place) in Liverpool, England, are so named due to a soup kitchen established to Count Rumford's plan which formerly stood on land adjacent to Rumford Street.
- Poland–Lithuania: Order of the White Eagle (1789).

== Bibliography ==
- An Essay on Chimney Fire-Places; With Proposals for Improving Them, to Save Fuel, to Render Dwelling-Houses More Comfortable and Salubrious, and Effectually to Prevent Chimnies from Smoking. Illustrated with Engravings, (1796).
- Collected Works of Count Rumford, Volume I, The Nature of Heat, (1968).
- Collected Works of Count Rumford, Volume II, Practical Applications of Heat, (1969).
- Collected Works of Count Rumford, Volume III, Devices and Techniques, (1969).
- Collected Works of Count Rumford, Volume IV, Light and Armament, (1970).
- Collected Works of Count Rumford, Volume V, Public Institutions, (1970).

== See also ==
- History of thermodynamics

== Citations ==
Political offices
Preceded by W. Knox; T. De Grey	Under-Secretary of State for the Colonies with W. Knox; 1780–1781	Succeeded by W. Knox; J. Fisher
