= Rumford fireplace =

Fireplace designed by Benjamin Thompson

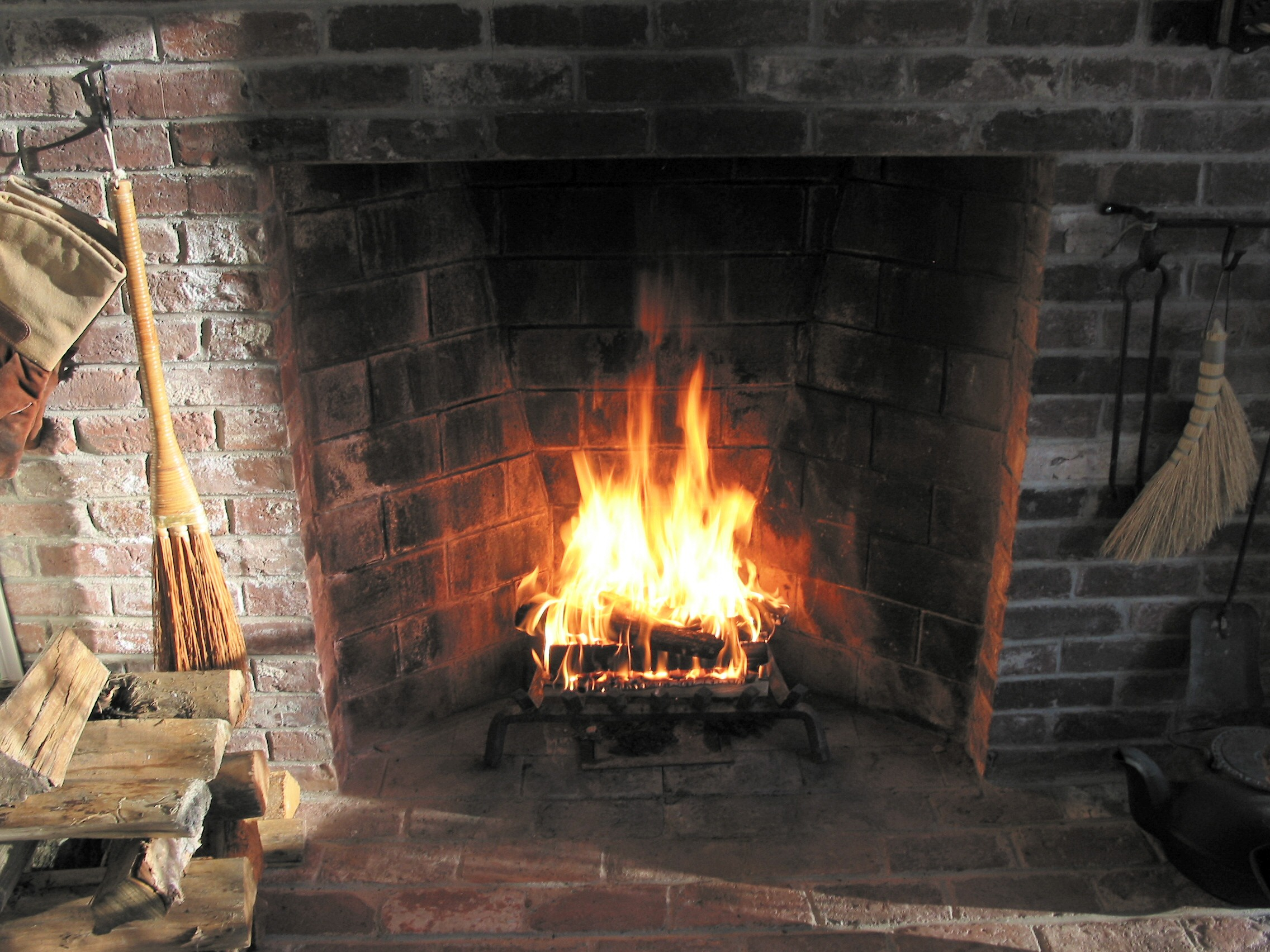
Rumford fireplace in a New England home

A Rumford fireplace, sometimes known as a Rumford stove, is a tall, shallow fireplace designed by Sir Benjamin Thompson, Count Rumford, an Anglo-American physicist best known for his investigations of heat. Its shallow, angled sides are designed to reflect heat into the room, and its streamlined throat minimizes turbulence, thereby carrying away smoke with little loss of heated room air.

== History ==
Rumford appears to have first developed an interest in smoking fireplaces following problems encountered following 1794 renovations of the Palmerston family's house in Hanover Square, Westminster, Rumford being at the time in intimate correspondence with Lady Palmerston. Around the end of 1795 Rumford experimented with various designs, his first practical installation being at the Board of Trade in Whitehall. Rumford later installed such fireplaces not only at the Palmerston house, but throughout those of the aristocracy of England.

His designs made the fireplaces smaller and shallower with widely angled covings so they would radiate better. And he streamlined the throat, or in his words "rounded off the breast" so as to "remove those local hindrances which forcibly prevent the smoke from following its natural tendency to go up the chimney..."

Rumford wrote two papers detailing his improvements on fireplaces in 1796 and 1798. He was well known and widely read in his lifetime and almost immediately in the 1790s his "Rumford fireplace" became state-of-the-art worldwide. Subsequent testing of Rumford's designs has shown that their efficiency would qualify them as clean-burning stoves.

== Principle of action ==
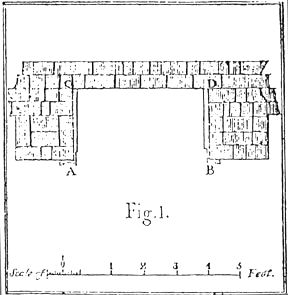
Fireplace before changes

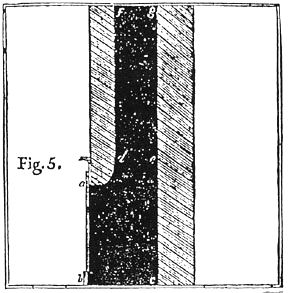
Fireplace before changes

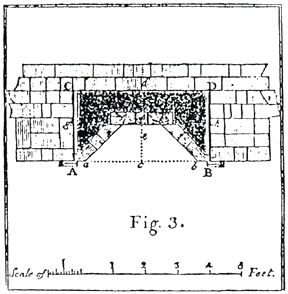
Plan of Rumford fireplace

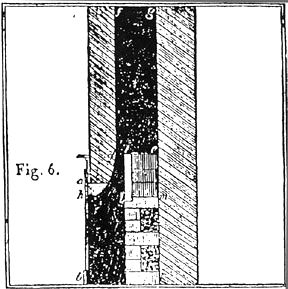
Section of Rumford fireplace

The Rumford fireplace created a sensation in London when he introduced the idea of restricting the chimney opening to increase the updraft. He and his workers changed fireplaces by inserting bricks into the hearth to make the side walls angled, and they added a choke to the chimney to create a circulation of air inside the chimney. In the unmodified chimney, smoke rises up the chimney propelled only by buoyancy—the heated gases from the fireplace being lighter than the surrounding air. This is especially ineffective when the fire is first lit, and the temperature and density of the smoke are closer to the ambient air. Thanks to the discontinuity produced by Rumford's brick "smoke shelf", the flow of smoke gases up the chimney became detached from the outside wall at the lip of the shelf. This set up a counter-circulation of outside air which flowed down the backside of the chimney, while a mixture of outside air and smoke flowed up the opposite side. The circulation inside the chimney, and above the smoke shelf, created a dynamic pressure in which the smoke gases were driven up one side of the chimney and cold air was pulled down the other. The air mixed with the rising smoke and increased the combined flow rising up the flue. It produced a circulating air-smoke flow, driving the smoke up into the chimney rather than lingering and often choking the residents. Many fashionable London houses were modified to his instructions and became smoke-free as well as more efficient. Thompson became a celebrity when news of his success became widespread. In an age when fires were the principal source of heat, this simple alteration in the design of fireplaces was copied widely.

== Usage ==
Rumford fireplaces were common from 1796, when Count Rumford first wrote about them, until about 1850. Jefferson had them built at Monticello, and Thoreau listed them among the modern conveniences that everyone took for granted. Existing fireplaces could be rebuilt to the Rumford design ("Rumfordized"). There are still many original Rumford fireplaces.

Rumford also invented a cast iron oven, known as the Rumford roaster. They were often installed together. This inspired the development of the kitchen range, also made in cast iron, which gave yet more control of the fire and also was used directly for cooking purposes.

== See also ==
- Franklin stove

== General and cited references ==
- G. I. Brown (1999). Scientist, Soldier, Statesman, Spy: Count Rumford: The Extraordinary Life of a Scientific Genius. Stroud, Gloucestershire, UK: Sutton Publishing. ISBN 9780750921848. OCLC 42754170.
