= Van de Graaff (crater) =

Crater on the Moon

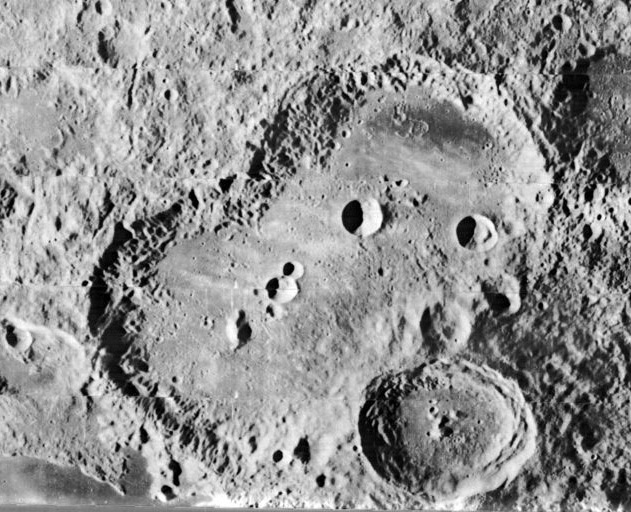
- Lunar Orbiter 2 image
- Coordinates: 27.4°S 172.2°E
- Diameter: 233 km
- Depth: 4.0 km
- Colongitude: 173° at sunrise
- Formation: Nectarian
- Eponym: Robert J. Van de Graaff

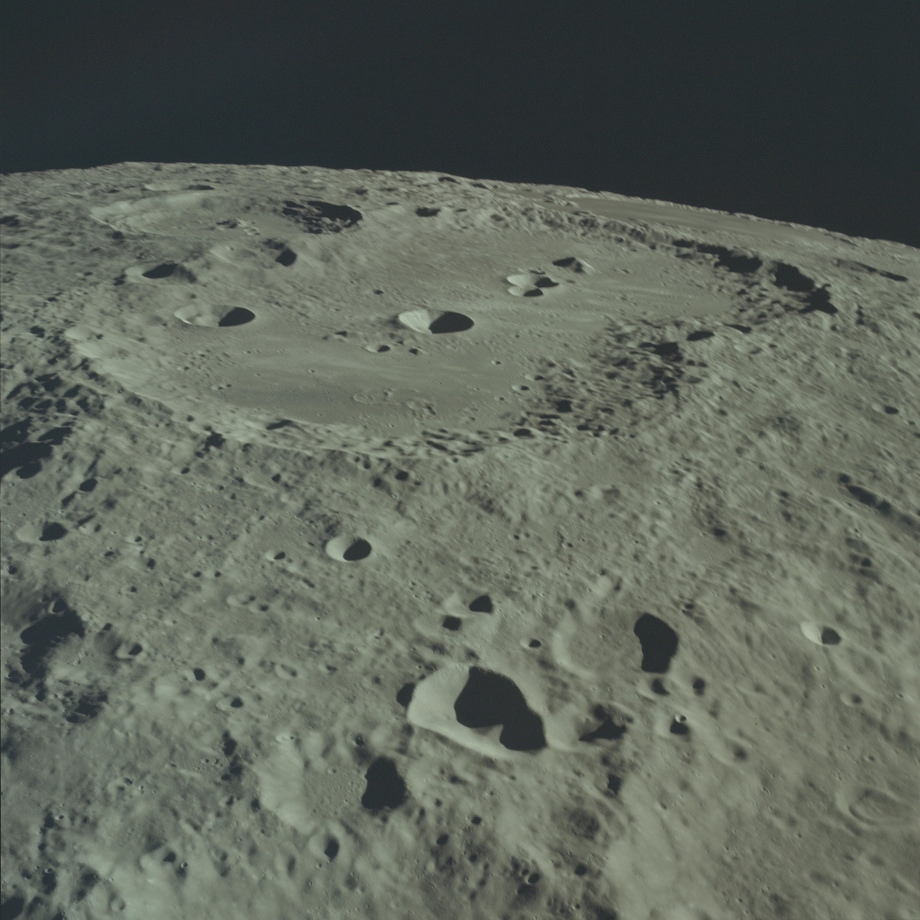
Oblique view of Van de Graaff from Apollo 17. NASA photo.

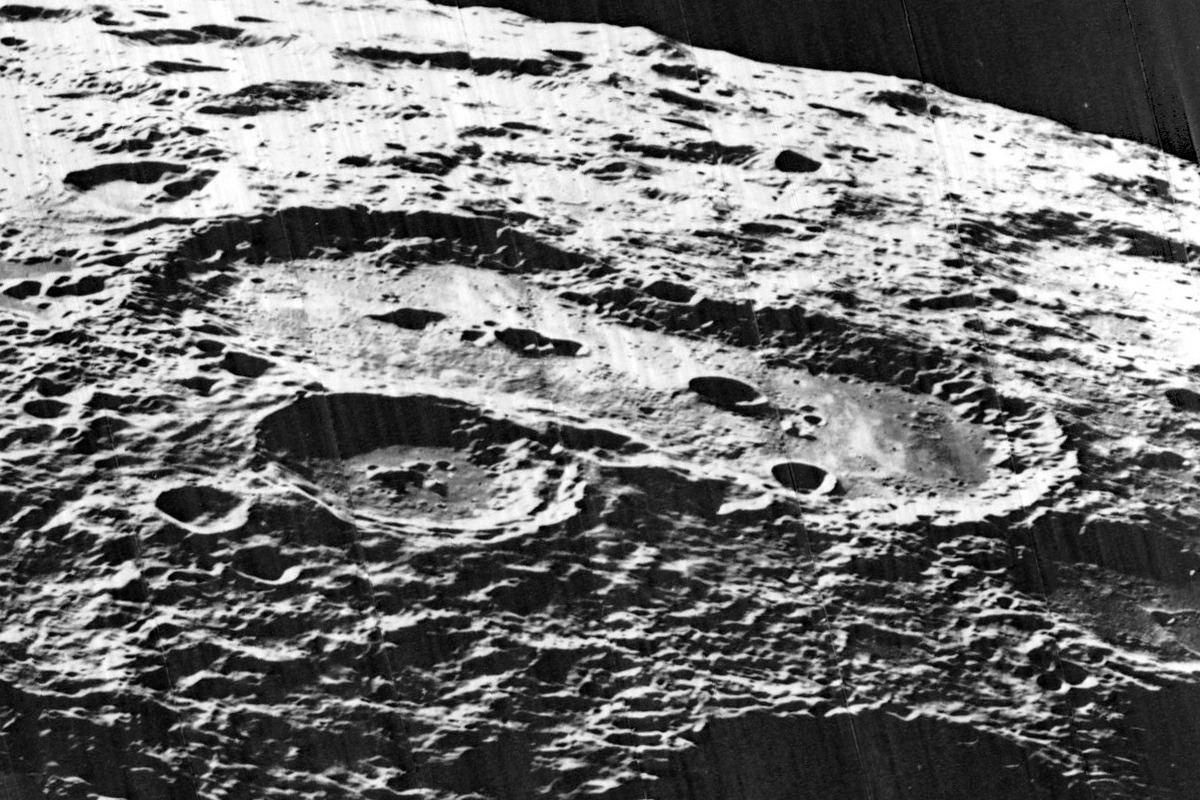
Lunar Orbiter 5 view, facing west.

Van de Graaff is a crater formation located on the far side of the Moon, on the northeast edge of Mare Ingenii. The crater Birkeland is attached to the southeast rim, nestling against the slightly narrower "waist" of the formation. To the north is Aitken, and Nassau lies to the east.

The crater is named for physicist Robert J. Van de Graaff, whose groundbreaking work includes the invention of the Van de Graaff generator.

== Description ==
Van de Graaff has the appearance of two merged craters, approximately in a figure-8 shape with no intervening rim separating the two halves. On the lunar geologic timescale, it is one of the largest craters of Nectarian age. The outer rim has some terracing along the southwest wall, but is generally in a worn and eroded state. A pair of craterlets overlay the southeast rim, next to Birkeland.

There are several small craters on the interior floor of Van de Graaff. The southwest section has a central peak, while the northeast floor is slightly smoother in form. The infrared spectrum of pure crystalline plagioclase has been identified on this peak.

The crater walls in the vicinity of Van de Graaff display an unusual grooved texture. This region lies at the antipode of the Mare Imbrium impact site, and it is thought that powerful seismic waves from this event converged at this point. Most likely this energy created the grooved appearance as the tremors triggered landslides, although the grooves may also have been formed by deposited clumps of ejecta from the impact.

Orbital studies of the Moon have demonstrated that there is a local magnetic field in the vicinity of this formation that is stronger than the natural lunar field. This is most likely an indication of volcanic rock underneath the surface. The crater also has a slightly higher concentration of radioactive materials than is typical for the lunar surface.

== Satellite craters ==
By convention these features are identified on lunar maps by placing the letter on the side of the crater midpoint that is closest to Van de Graaff.

Van de Graaff	Latitude	Longitude	Diameter
C	26.6° S	172.8° E	20 km
F	26.8° S	174.6° E	20 km
J	28.5° S	174.1° E	25 km
M	30.6° S	171.5° E	19 km
Q	27.6° S	171.3° E	15 km
