= Leibnitz (crater) =

Lunar impact crater

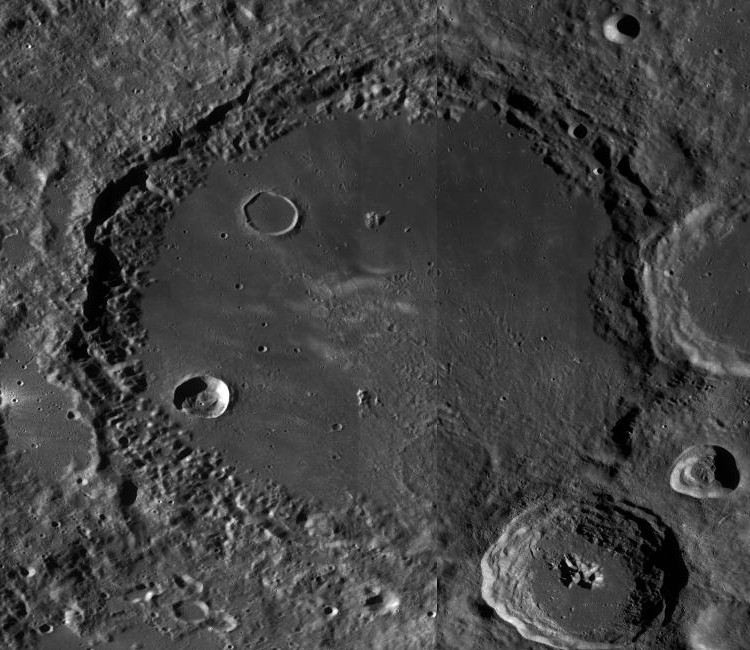
- Mosaic of LRO WAC images
- Coordinates: 38.3°S 179.2°E
- Diameter: 245 km
- Depth: Unknown
- Colongitude: 186° at sunrise
- Formation: Pre-Nectarian
- Eponym: Gottfried Leibniz

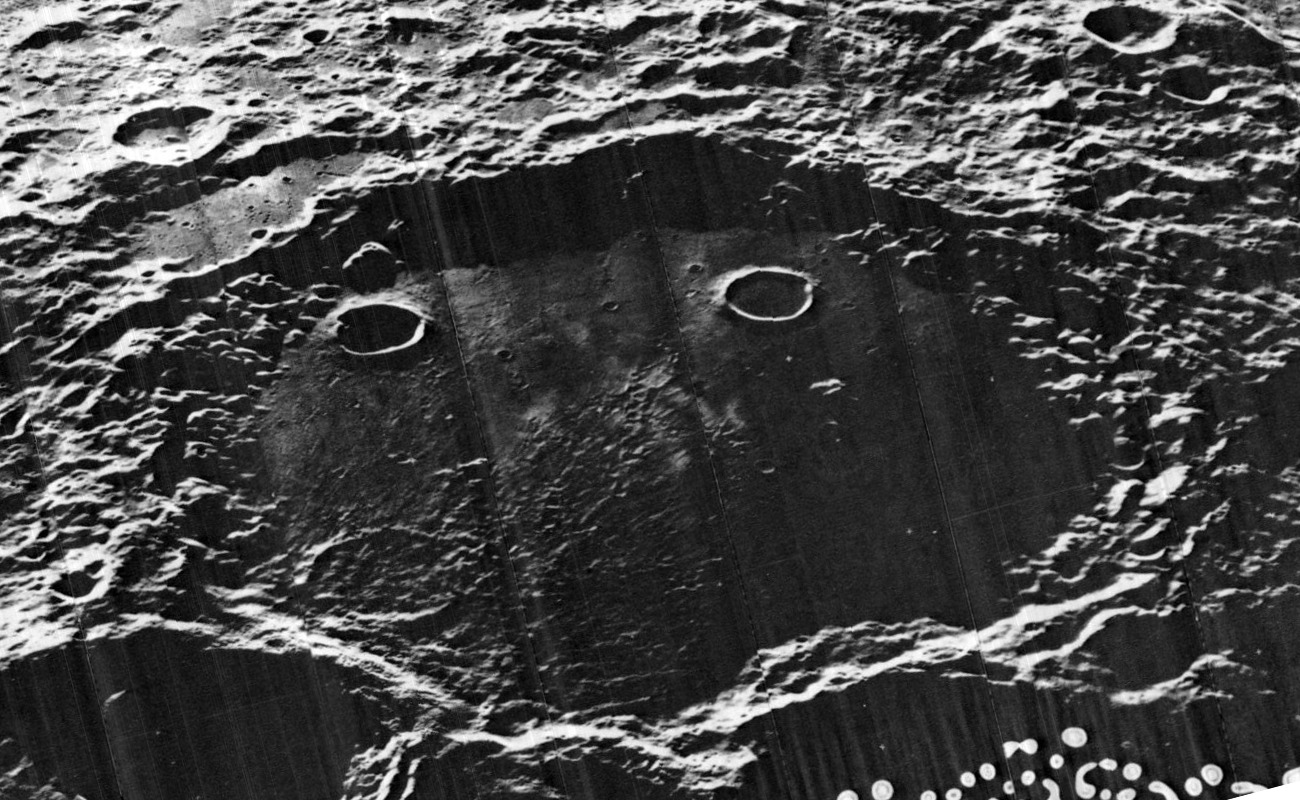
Oblique Lunar Orbiter 5 image, facing west

Leibnitz is a huge lunar impact crater that is located in the southern hemisphere on the far side of the Moon. This formation is the same size as Clavius on the near side. It is located to the east-southeast of Mare Ingenii, and is joined to the northeast rim of Von Kármán. Attached to the eastern rim of Leibnitz is Davisson, and intruding into the southeast rim is Finsen. Farther to the west is the large Oppenheimer.

This formation dates to the Pre-Nectarian period of the lunar geologic timescale. The outer rim of Leibnitz is roughly circular, with a prominent outward bulge along the southern face. It has received some impact erosion and wear, with several tiny craters lying along the edge and the inner wall. The rim to the east and southeast has been somewhat modified by the craters Davisson and Finsen.

Much of the interior floor of this walled plain has been resurfaced by basaltic lava, leaving a level, nearly featureless surface with the same low albedo as the dark lunar mare to the northwest. However the southeastern part of the floor is more irregular, because ejecta from Finsen covers part of it. The dark floor is covered in places by streaks of ray material, and several tiny craterlets. The small crater Leibnitz X near the northwest inner wall has been flooded by lava, leaving only a roughly circular rim projecting above the surface.

Prior to formal naming in 1970 by the IAU, the crater was known as Crater 374.

== Magnetism ==
The crater is also home to one of the enigmatic, high albedo features known as a Lunar Swirl. These features are associated with localised magnetic anomalies, as is the case with Leibnitz. The Leibnitz Swirls are part of a complex of similar features in the nearby Van de Graaff crater-pair and Mare Ingenii.

== Satellite craters ==
By convention these features are identified on lunar maps by placing the letter on the side of the crater midpoint that is closest to Leibnitz.

Leibnitz	Latitude	Longitude	Diameter
R	39.3° S	176.3° E	19 km
S	39.6° S	171.8° E	28 km
X	36.5° S	177.3° E	19 km
