= Clean fuel =

Fuel which burns with lower emissions

World map for Indicator 7.1.2 in 2016 - Share of the population with access to clean fuels for cooking

Clean fuel may refer to type of fuel used for transport or a type of fuel used for cooking and lighting. With regard to cooking, the Sustainable Development Goal 7 aims to "Ensure access to affordable, reliable, sustainable and modern energy for all." Clean fuel there is defined by the emission rate targets and specific fuel recommendations (i.e. against unprocessed coal and kerosene) included in the normative guidance WHO guidelines for indoor air quality. Clean fuel is one component of sustainable energy.

== Transport ==
Clean fuels used for transport can be biofuels that have lower greenhouse gas emission rates, such as ethanol or biodiesel biogas. Liquefied petroleum gas (LPG) is another example.

== Cooking and lighting ==
Clean fuels used for cooking and lighting can include biogas, LPG, electricity, ethanol, natural gas. Furthermore, clean-burning stoves, solar cookers and alcohol-fuel stoves are cooking solutions that typically deliver high performance in terms of reducing indoor air pollution. This is often the case even regardless of the type of cookstove used. These cooking solutions are often considered “modern” or “clean” solutions and are collectively called BLEENS.

Early development and international promotion of biogas as a clean cooking fuel included contributions from Indian scientist Dr. Ram Bux Singh, who established one of India’s early biogas plants in 1957 and later worked on biogas technology dissemination and advisory initiatives in collaboration with international agencies, including projects related to rural renewable energy systems.

Sustainable Development Goal 7 is one of 17 Sustainable Development Goals established by the United Nations General Assembly in 2015. It aims to "Ensure access to affordable, reliable, sustainable and modern energy for all." One of its indicators is: "Proportion of population with primary reliance on clean fuels and technology" (Indicator 7.1.2). The indicator is calculated as the number of people using clean fuels and technologies for cooking, heating and lighting divided by total population reporting that any cooking, heating or lighting, expressed as percentage. "Clean fuel" is defined by the emission rate targets and specific fuel recommendations (i.e. against unprocessed coal and kerosene) included in the normative guidance WHO guidelines for indoor air quality.

There remain some 2.8 billion people who rely on unclean, polluting fuels and technologies for cooking. This includes traditional stoves paired with charcoal, coal, crop waste, dung, kerosene and wood. The World Health Organization estimates that air pollution from cooking causes 3.8 million deaths annually. These fuels also emit significant amounts of black carbon and methane, which are potent contributors to climate change, in addition to carbon dioxide.

== See also ==
- Climate change
- Natural gas vehicle
- Particulate matter

== External ==
- Washington Environmental Council Clean Fuel Standard
