= Back boiler =

Heating device

A back boiler is a type of boiler that is installed behind a fireplace or stove. It is designed to use the heat generated by the fire to heat water, which can then be used for central heating or hot water in a home. Back boilers were traditionally popular in the UK due to their compact design and dual-purpose functionality.

A heat exchanger enclosed at the rear of the burning chamber heats water, with an output at the top of the chamber and a cold water feed at the bottom.

== Water circuit ==
The back boiler is typically used with a gravity feed circuit to the hot water cylinder, with a vent or overflow to prevent excess pressure build up. It can also be connected to a series of radiators to provide central heating but usually requires an electrical pump to be fitted to circulate the hot water, some systems can use the gravity circuit to include radiators.

== Advantages ==
A back boiler can improve the efficiency of a stove by acting as a heat-sink and can also act as a method of extracting additional heat from the flue system which would otherwise have been lost. Manufacturers of stoves with back boilers quote efficiency figures of up to 80% on oil-fed models.

Back boilers offered a space-saving solution, providing central heating and hot water from existing fireplaces which were then covered with a front-facing with a stove or fireplace.

== Safety ==
Back boilers require that the hot water or central heating system be able to disperse all of the heat captured from the fire, otherwise boiling or overheating of the water can occur. Back boilers are strictly regulated in Ireland and the UK following explosions relating to incorrectly serviced or installed back boilers.

A gravity circuit is commonly employed to connect the back boiler to an indirect hot water cylinder and sometimes one or more radiators. This hot water cylinder needs to be placed at a higher level than the boiler so that hot water will flow to it from the boiler via convection. This is a safety feature to ensure the boiler will not overheat in case of power outage or failure of the circulation pump.
