= Envirofit International =

Envirofit International is an American non-profit organization. It develops technology which aims to reduce air pollution and enhance energy efficiency among developing nations.

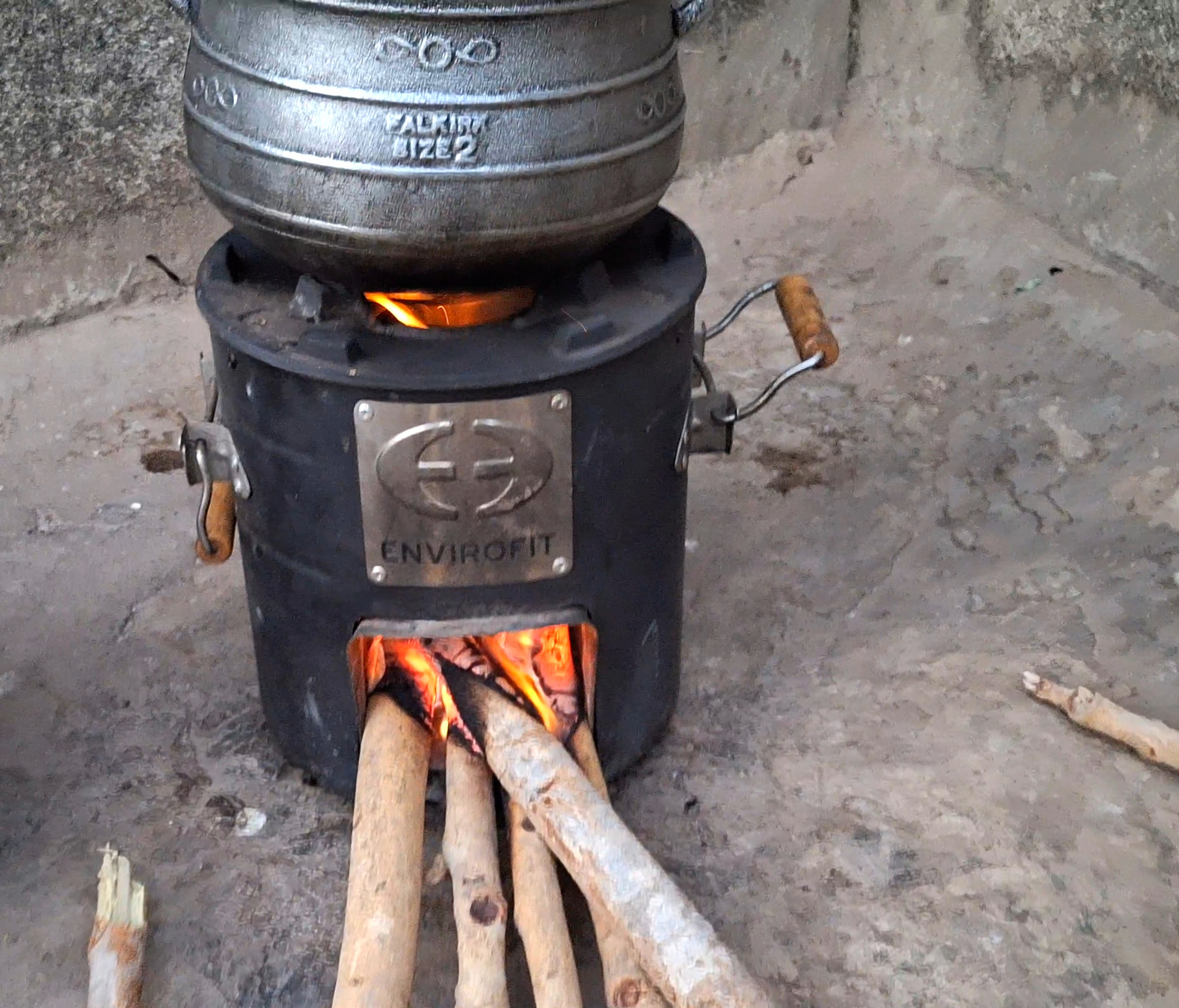
Cooking stove in Ghana

Among its products have been affordable clean burning stoves for poorer communities.

It is based in Fort Collins, Colorado, Envirofit was founded in 2003 by Tim Bauer, Nathan Lorenz, Paul Hudnut, and Bryan Willson.

== History ==
Envirofit International began in 2003 as an adjunct program to the Colorado State University Engines and Energy Conversion Laboratory. The program's goals were to bring sustainable clean energy solutions to help solve health and energy challenges on a global scale.

The first product was a retrofit direct injection technology to reduce pollution from two-stroke cycle vehicle engines in the Philippines. This project won the Rolex Award for Enterprise in 2008.

In 2007, Envirofit partnered with the Shell Foundation's Breathing Space Program to develop clean cooking stoves. They were designed to withstand high temperatures and frequent use at a low cost. Most of the target market is in the bands of people below the poverty line.

== Recognition ==
In 2009, Lorenz and Bauer were named Heroes of the Environment by Time magazine.

In 2013, The Economist named the Envirofit founder as innovators of the year.

== See also ==
- Engineers Without Borders
