= Clean-burning stove =

Stove with reduced toxic emissions

Number of people without access to clean fuels for cooking, 2016

A clean-burning stove is a stove with reduced toxic and polluting emissions. The term refers to solid-fuel stoves such as wood-burning stoves for either domestic heating, domestic cooking or both. In the context of a cooking stove, especially in lower-income countries, such a stove is distinct from a clean-burning-fuel stove, which typically burns clean fuels such as ethanol, biogas, LPG, or kerosene. Studies into clean-burning cooking stoves in lower-income countries have shown that they reduce the emissions of dangerous particulates and carbon monoxide significantly, use less fuel than regular stoves, and result in fewer burn injuries. However, the emissions some supposedly clean-burning cookstoves produce are still much greater than safe limits, and in several studies in lower income countries they did not appear to be effective at reducing illnesses such as pneumonia induced by breathing polluted air, which may have many sources.

== Use ==
Solid fuel stoves designed to be used for domestic heating, those designed to be used for cooking, and those designed for both, can all be described as being clean-burning. In all cases these types of stove are designed to produce lower emissions of particulates and other pollutants than the open fires, traditional stoves, or other appliances they replace. They have been proposed for introduction to developing countries, particularly the cooking type in order to improve air quality, and where they replace open fires they have other advantages such as a reduction in accidents due to burn injuries and house fires.

== Development ==
A research summary of the development of clean-burning, domestic, heating stoves was published in 1982 by Flow Research Inc. Such stoves introduced in the 1980s burnt wood pellets rather than logs. By 1986, a directory was available listing 75 such stoves which had satisfied U.S. emission testing.

== Operation ==
Clean-burning stoves can be catalytic (using catalytic converters) or noncatalytic. The noncatalytic designs recirculate smoke to achieve fuller combustion.

Once the stove is warmed to within operating temperatures, it produces no visible smoke, emitting mostly water and carbon dioxide. Non-catalytic stoves have higher emissions than the new catalytic stoves do when the latter are operated correctly (as of 2003).

A conventional domestic heating stove in 1984 emitted particulates amounting to approximately 20g per kg of fuel (0.3oz/lb). Research by the United States Environmental Protection Agency (EPA) was reported in 1986 to show that conditions such as asthma, bronchitis and emphysema may be aggravated by the use of conventional heating stoves.

== Regulation ==
The EPA was reported as announcing plans in 1987 to encourage manufacturers to design heating stoves with reduced emissions. Clean-burning stoves are authorised for use in smoke control areas in some countries by organisations such as the EPA.

== See also ==
- Agency for Non-conventional Energy and Rural Technology
- Ashden Awards for Sustainable Energy
- Energy for All
- International Renewable Energy Agency
- List of stoves
- Sustainable Development Goal 7
