= Stove =

Device used to generate heat or to cook

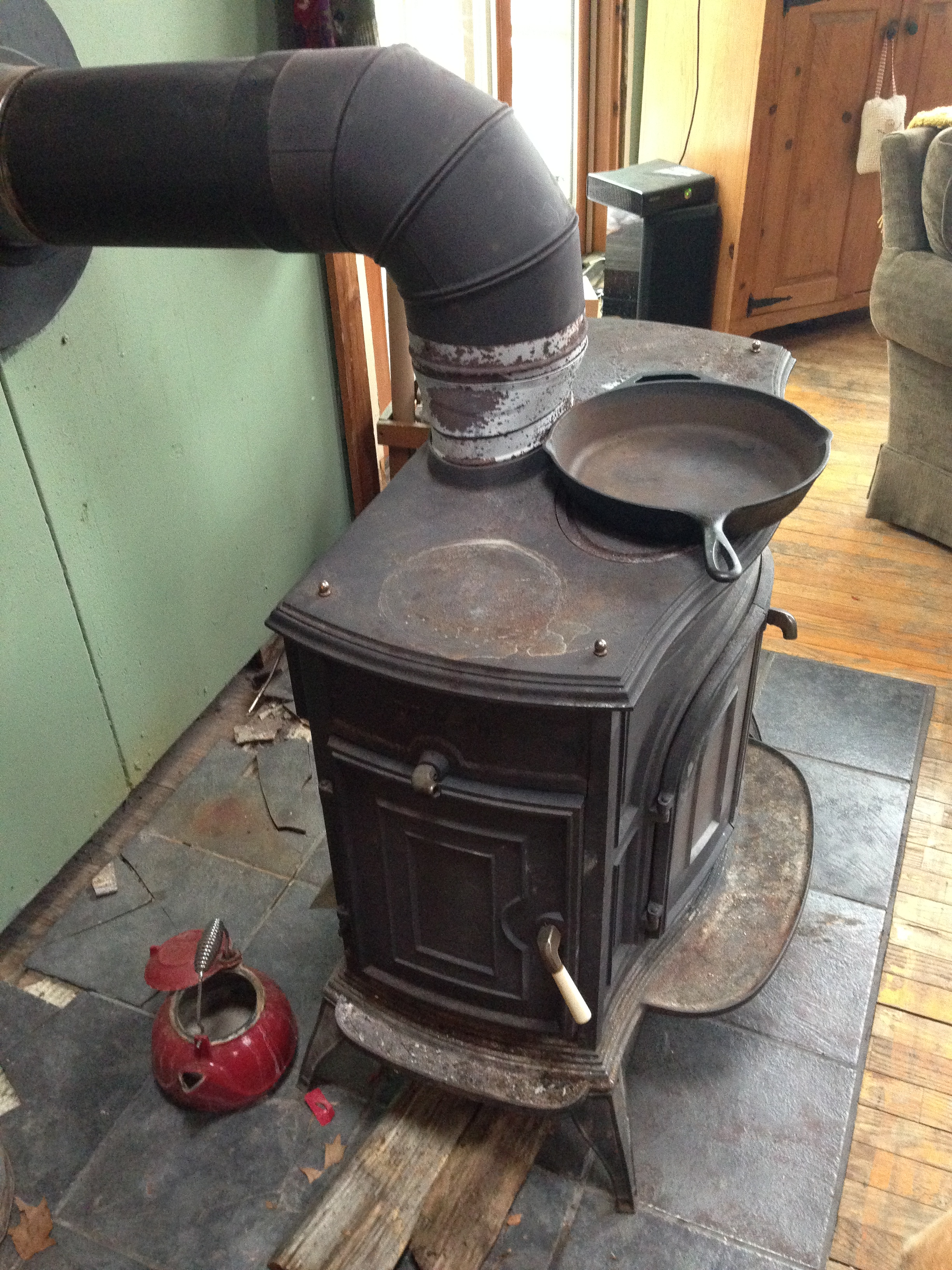
Cast-iron stove from the 1800s. This stove heats the room with its firebox and provides a heating surface for pans, allowing for cooking.

An electric stove used for home kitchens in modern times. It provides burners on top, and an oven.

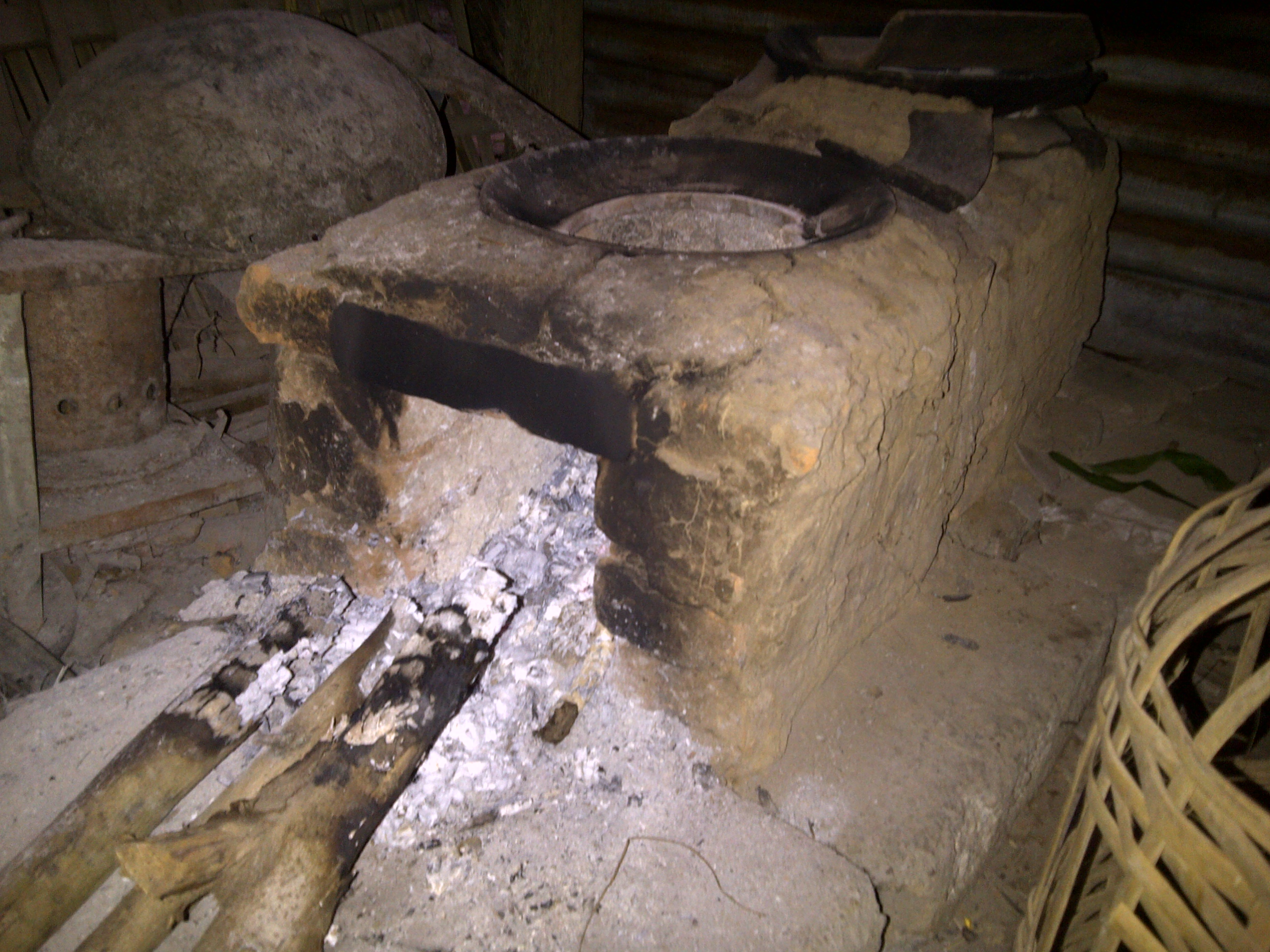
A traditional Indonesian stove. This stove is made from bricks, and uses wood as the fuel.

A stove or range is an appliance or construction that generates heat inside or atop the device using an energy source. They differ from ovens, since ovens keep their heat in closed chambers, while stoves typically allow their heat to flow outwards.

Stoves are used for cooking or indoor heating, traditionally both. Stoves contain and concentrate heat for better efficiency than a firepit or hearth. Stoves can be powered with many fuels, such as wood, coal, natural gas, propane, oil, kerosine, and electricity. Other than ovens, stoves are the most common and traditional fixtures for applying heat to food for cooking.

Traditionally, stoves were built from stones, clay, rammed-earth, or bricks. In modern times, stoves made of Cast-iron, steel, and glass tops are common. Brick stoves are still common in outdoor settings, such as parks and backyards. Despite being firepits, more sophisticated dug-out structures with a designated fire chamber and designated cooking part (such as the dakota fire hole) can arguably be considered a stove that uses the earth as its body.

Modern cooking stoves often double as stoves and ovens. Developed nations today typically use electric-stoves or gas-stoves for cooking. Developing nations and rural areas typically still use wood-fire stoves or firepits for cooking meals and heating the home.

Electric and Magnetic-induction stoves are the popular choice in home kitchens, because their energy levels can be controlled exactly, and do not involve a flame, keeping the indoor air clean, preventing carbon-monoxide buildup, and greatly reducing the chances of a house fire; as well as being more energy efficient, which lowers costs long term. Gas-stoves also have a risk of gas leaks, either from a leaking gas line, or someone forgetting to turn the dial to 'off' after putting out the flames.

Propane or natural-gas stoves are more common in institutional kitchens and restaurants, because gas-stoves offer instant heat, more intense heat, and long-term durability, while still offering some heat-control. These attributes are ideal for situations where speed, bulk-efficiency, and heavy usage are needed.

Concerns about air pollution have fostered efforts to improve stove design, and replace old stoves with better alternatives. Pellet stoves, for instance, are a type of clean-burning stove. Air-tight stoves, another type, burn their fuel more completely than conventional ones and so reduce the amount of the combustion by-products. Rocket Stoves are a recently invented stove type, that are engineered for the complete-combustion of wood, which is helpful for people in developing countries who rely on wood fires for cooking. Another method of reducing air pollution is through the addition of a device to clean the exhaust gas, such as a filter or afterburner. Research and development on safer and lower-emission stoves is continuously evolving.

== Etymology ==
Old English had a word stofa, meaning a hot-air bath or sweating room. However, this usage did not survive, and the word was taken newly from Middle Low German or Middle Dutch in the 15th or 16th century, later meaning any room heated with a furnace. By the 17th century it had come to mean a heated box such as an oven, and by the 18th century could mean an open fireplace.

== History ==
=== Versions prior ===
Cooking was performed over an open fire since nearly two million years ago. It is uncertain how fires were started at these times; some hypotheses include the removal of burning branches from wildfires, spark generation through hitting rocks, or accidental lighting through the chipping of stone tools. During the Paleolithic era, approximately 200,000 to 40,000 years ago, primitive hearths were constructed, with stones arranged in a circle shape. Human homes centered around these hearths for warmth and food. Open fires were quite effective; most fires are 30% efficient on average, and heat is distributed positively, with no heat being lost into the body of a stove. An estimated three million people still cook their food today over open fires.

Pottery and other cooking vessels were later placed on open fire; eventually, setting the vessel on a support, such as a base of three stones, resulted in a stove. The three-stone stove is still widely used around the world. In some areas it developed into a U-shaped dried mud or brick enclosure with the opening in the front for fuel and air, sometimes with a second smaller hole at the rear.

=== Early designs ===
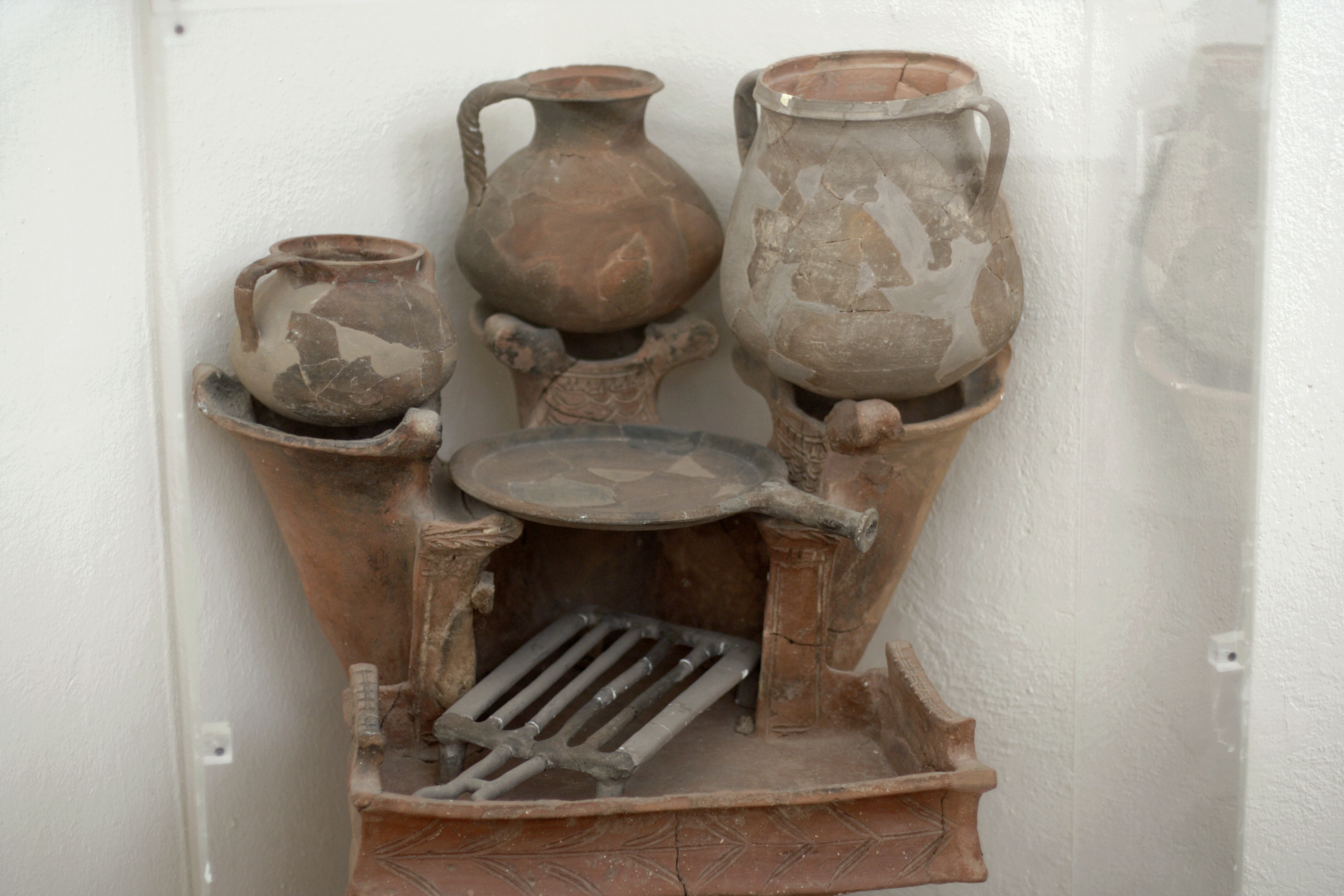
Roman era stove, Delos, Greece.

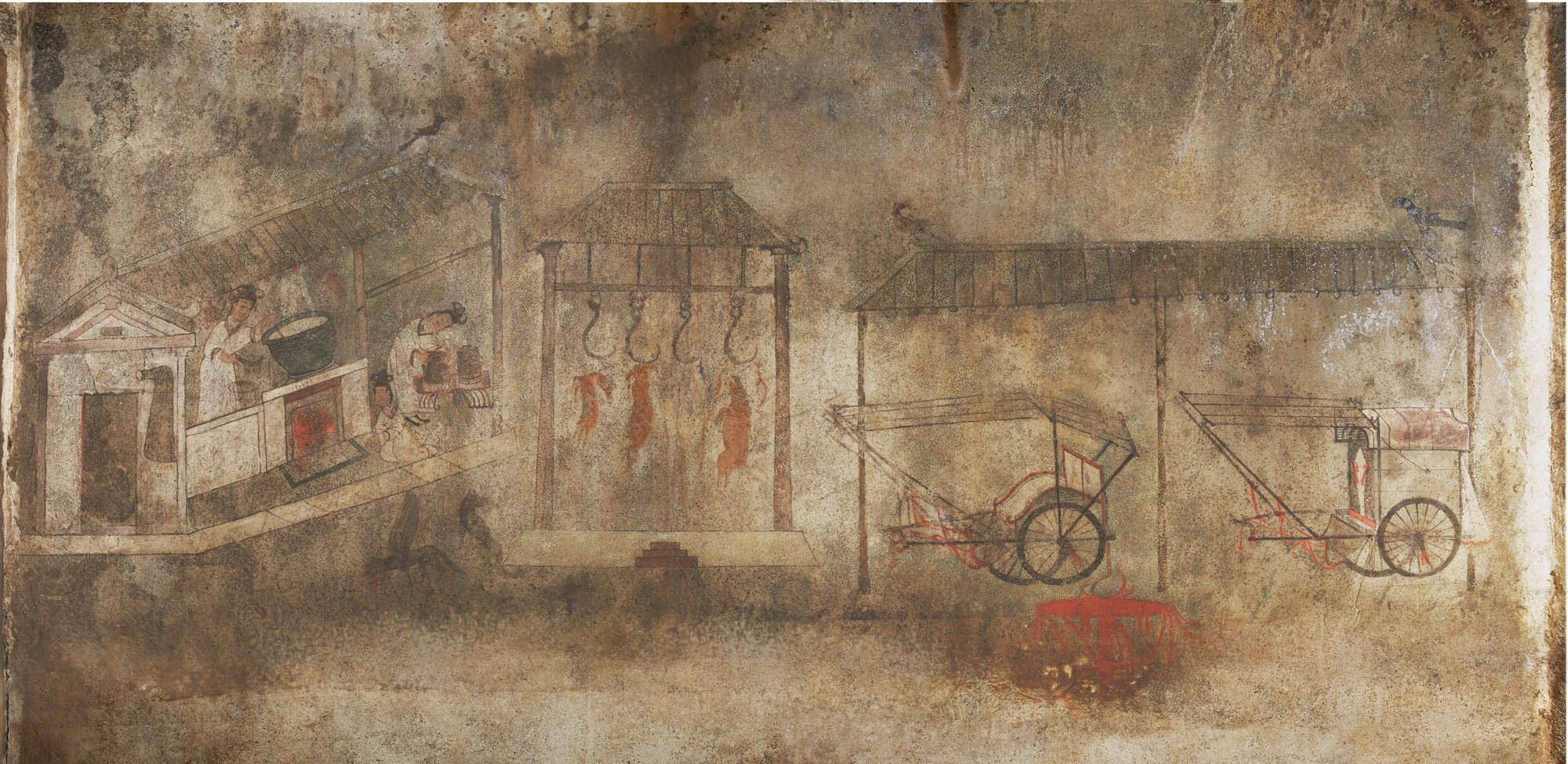
Depiction of a kitchen, eastern chamber, Anak Tomb No. 3, Korea, c.357 CE

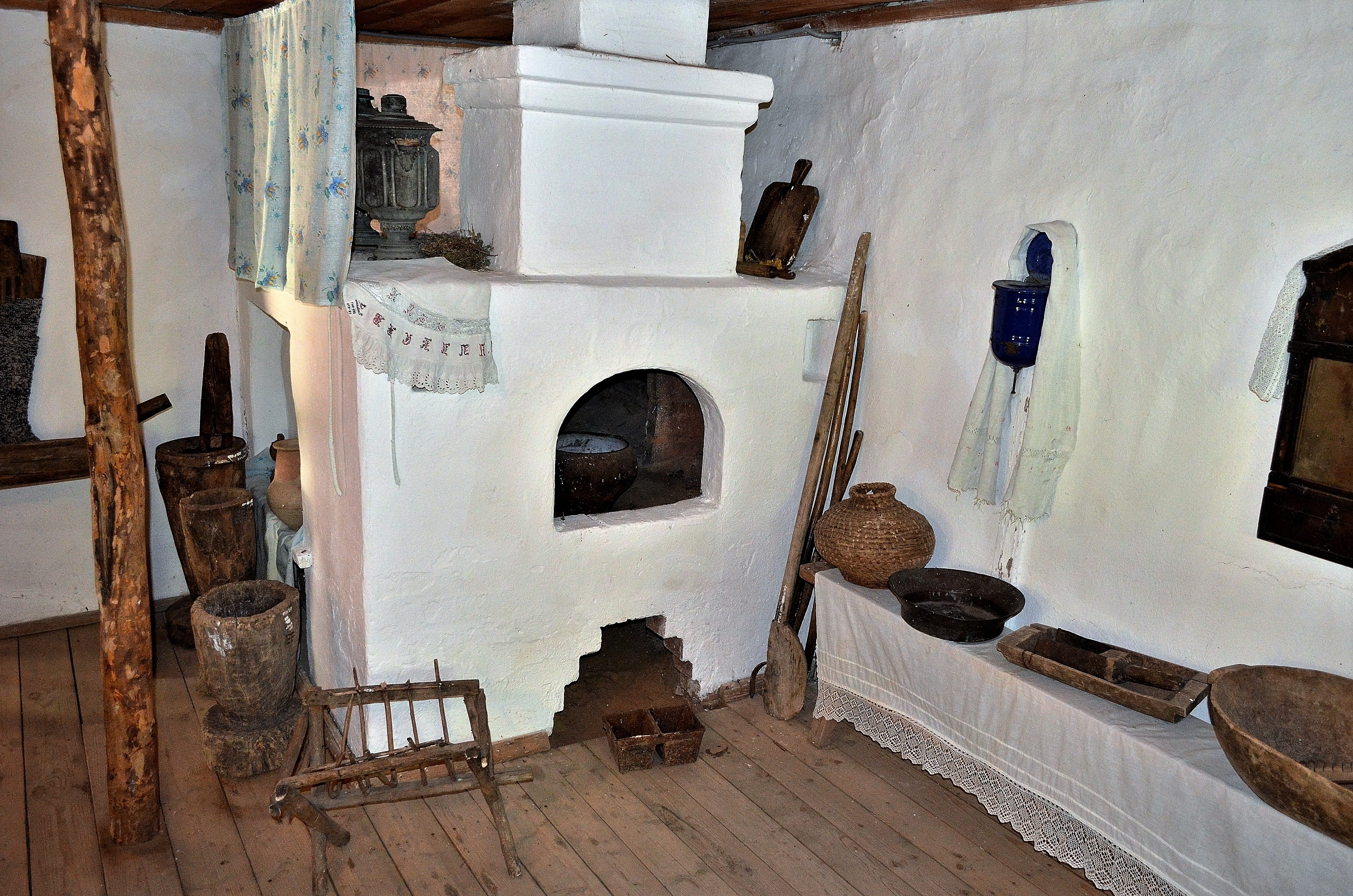
A typical Russian stove placed at a corner of a wall, in the Ilovlinsky Museum, Ilovya, Ilovlinsky District, Volgograd Oblast, Russia.

Bronze and Iron age Korean Agungi and buttumak, that both offer a heated platform, above a firebox, to cook, and that funnel the smoke and residual heat, from the stoves enclosed fire, through underfloor channels, to offer Underfloor heating, are known. While a model of a portable, cast Bronze stove, featuring a dragon headed chimney, dated to the Han Dynasty, was discovered in a tomb in Hohhot.

In similar times, the Ancient Egyptian, Jewish and Roman people used stone and brick ovens, fueled with wood, in order to make bread and other culinary staples. These designs did not differ extremely from modern-day pizza ovens. Later Scandinavian stoves featured a long, hollow iron chimney with iron baffles constructed to extend the passage of the leaving gases and extract maximum heat. Russian versions are still frequently used today in northern nations, as they hold six thick-walled stone flues. This design is frequently positioned at the intersection of internal partition walls, with a piece of the stove and flue inside each of four rooms; a fire is kept until the stove and flues are hot, at which point the fire is extinguished and the flues are closed, storing the heat.

During Colonial America, beehive-shaped brick ovens were used to bake cakes and other pastries. Temperature control was closely managed by burning the appropriate quantity of wood to ash and then testing by inserting hands inside, adding additional wood, or opening the door to allow cooling.

The oldest surviving stove in France is attributed to the Alsace region, dated to 1490, and made out of brick and tile, including the flue pipe.

=== Ceramic ===
Clay ovens have been used for millennia for cooking.

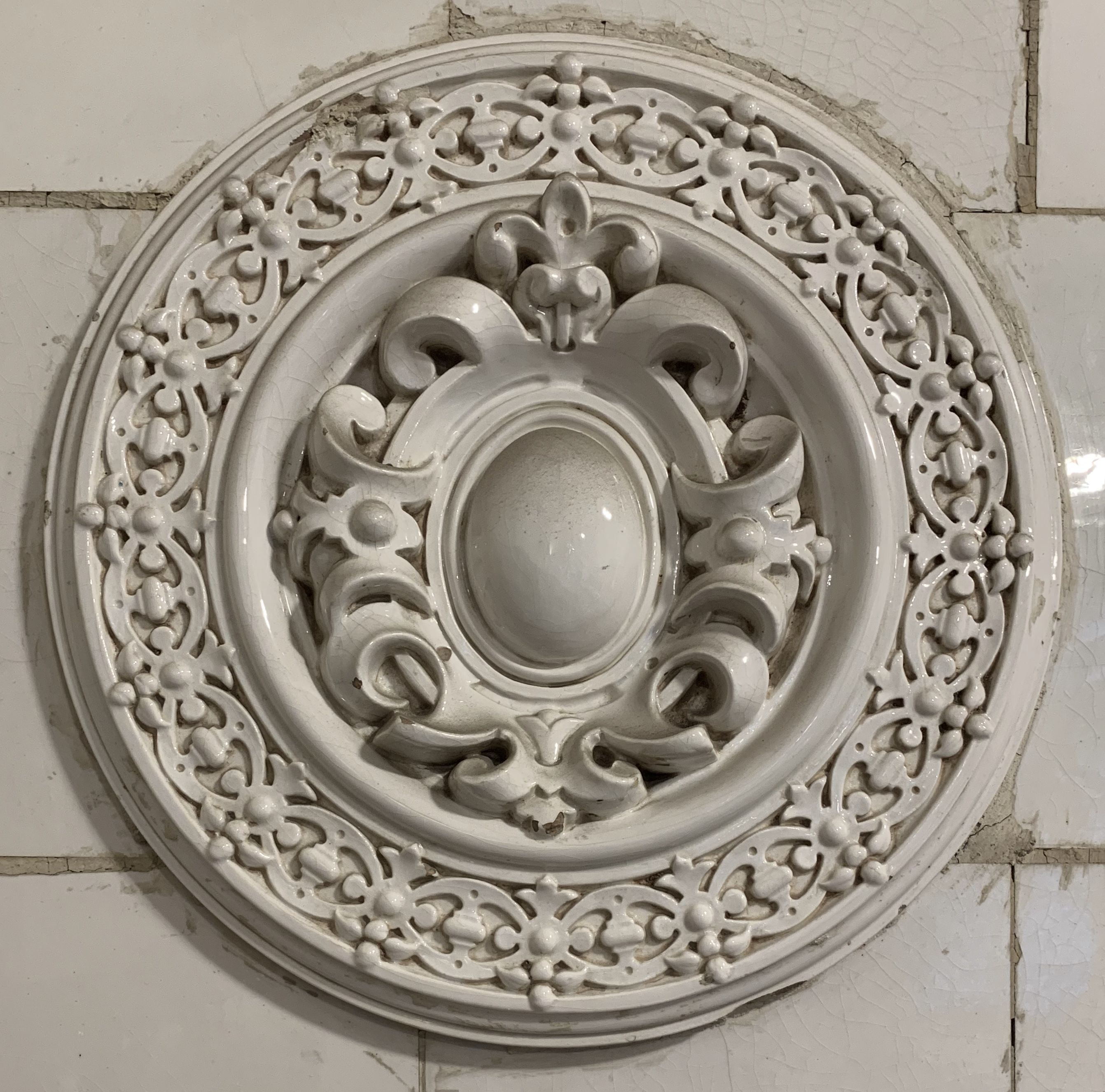
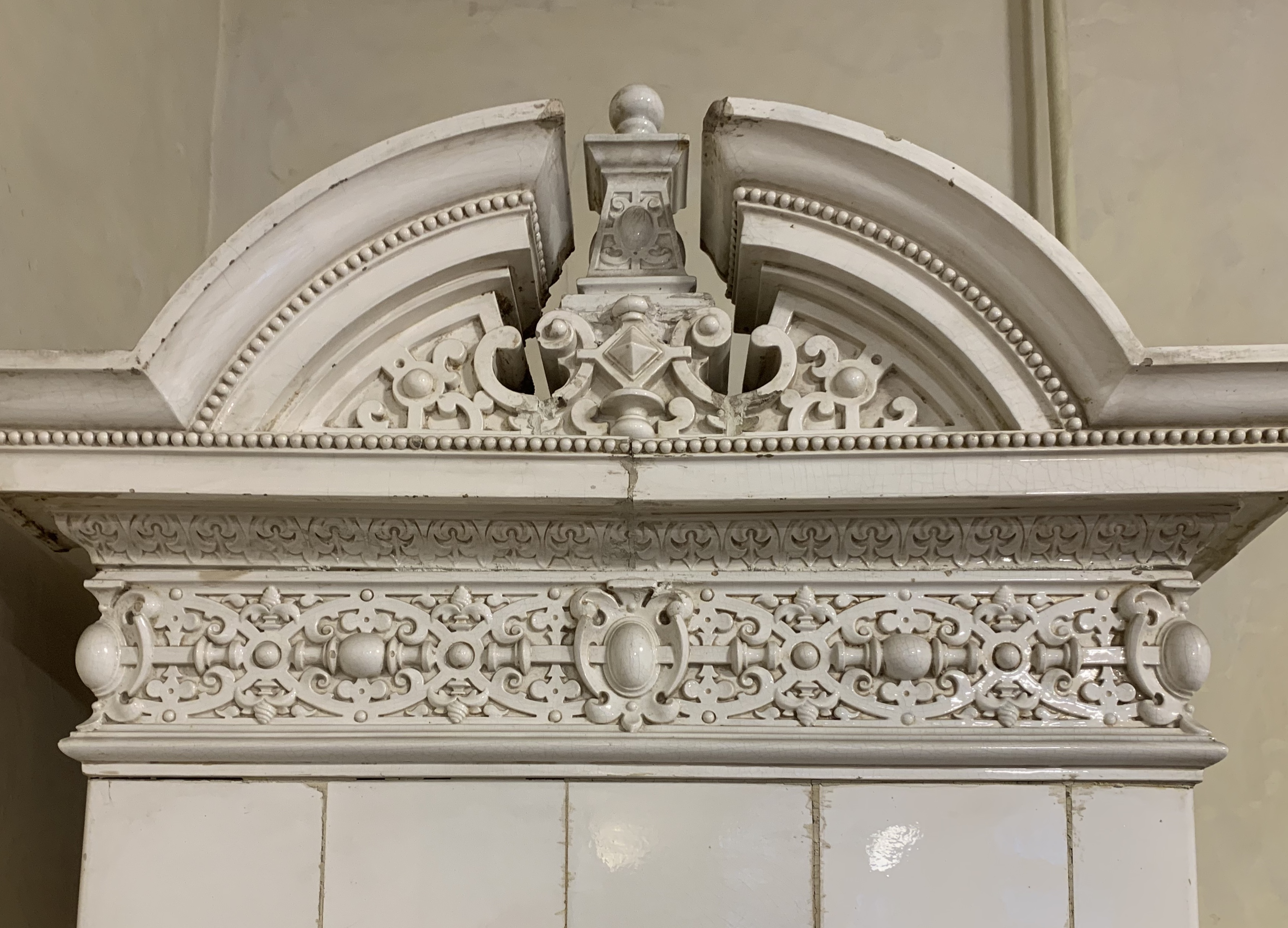
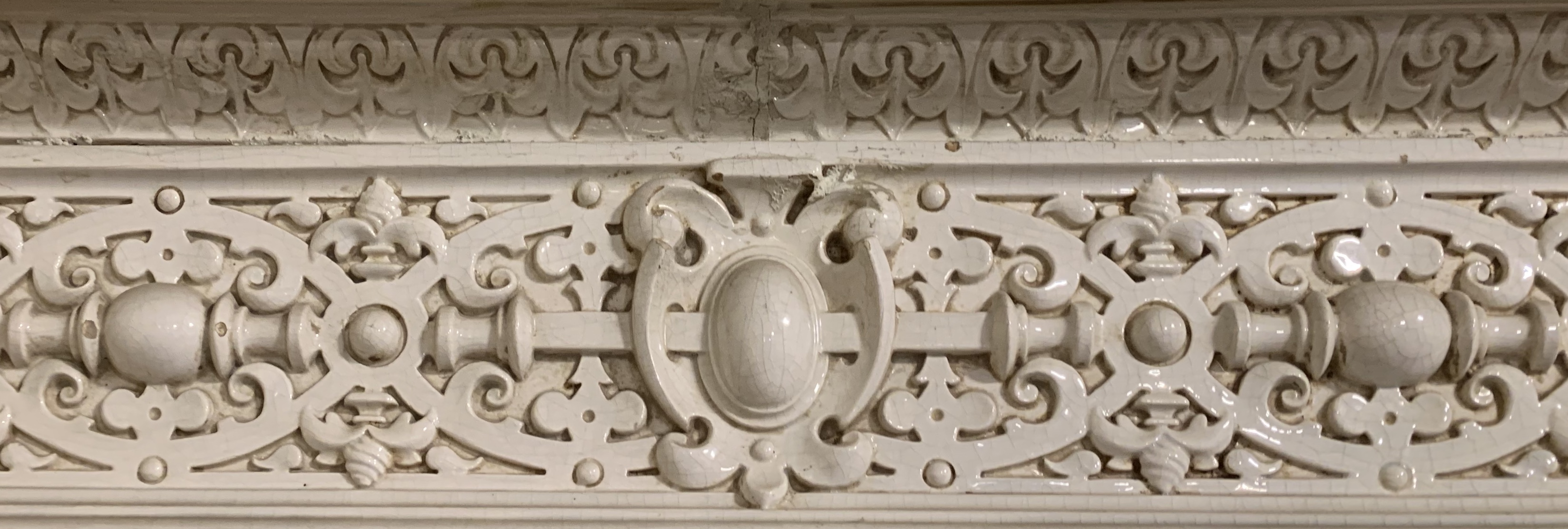
Details of a Renaissance Revival stove from the D.A. Sturdza House in Bucharest (Romania)

Masonry heaters were developed from Neolithic times to control air flow in stoves. A masonry heater is designed to allow complete combustion by burning fuels at full-temperature with no restriction of air inflow. Due to its large thermal mass the captured heat is radiated over long periods of time without the need of constant firing, and the surface temperature is generally not dangerous to touch.

==== Gallery ====
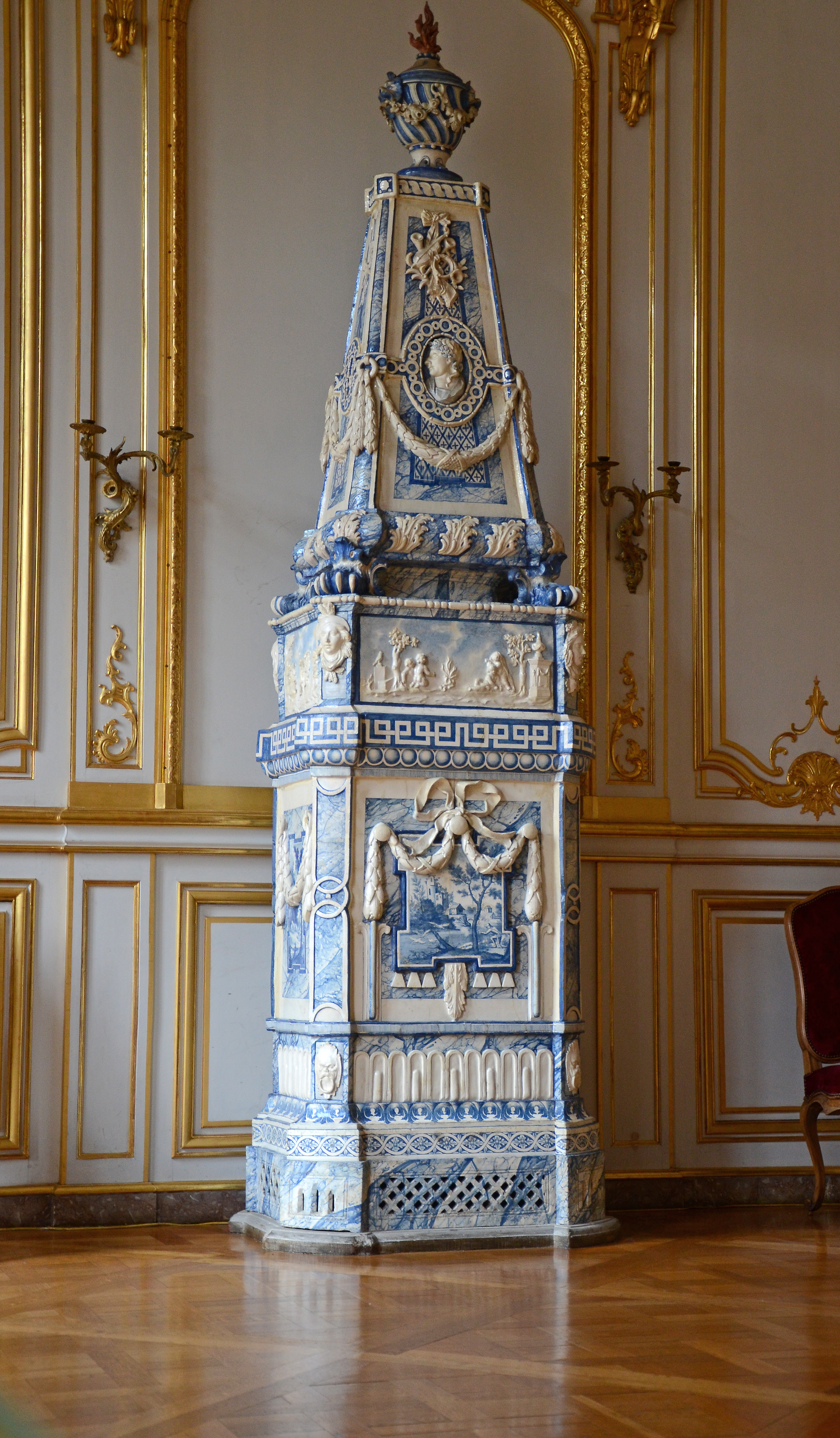
18th-century Neoclassical cocklestove in the Palais Rohan (Strasbourg, France)

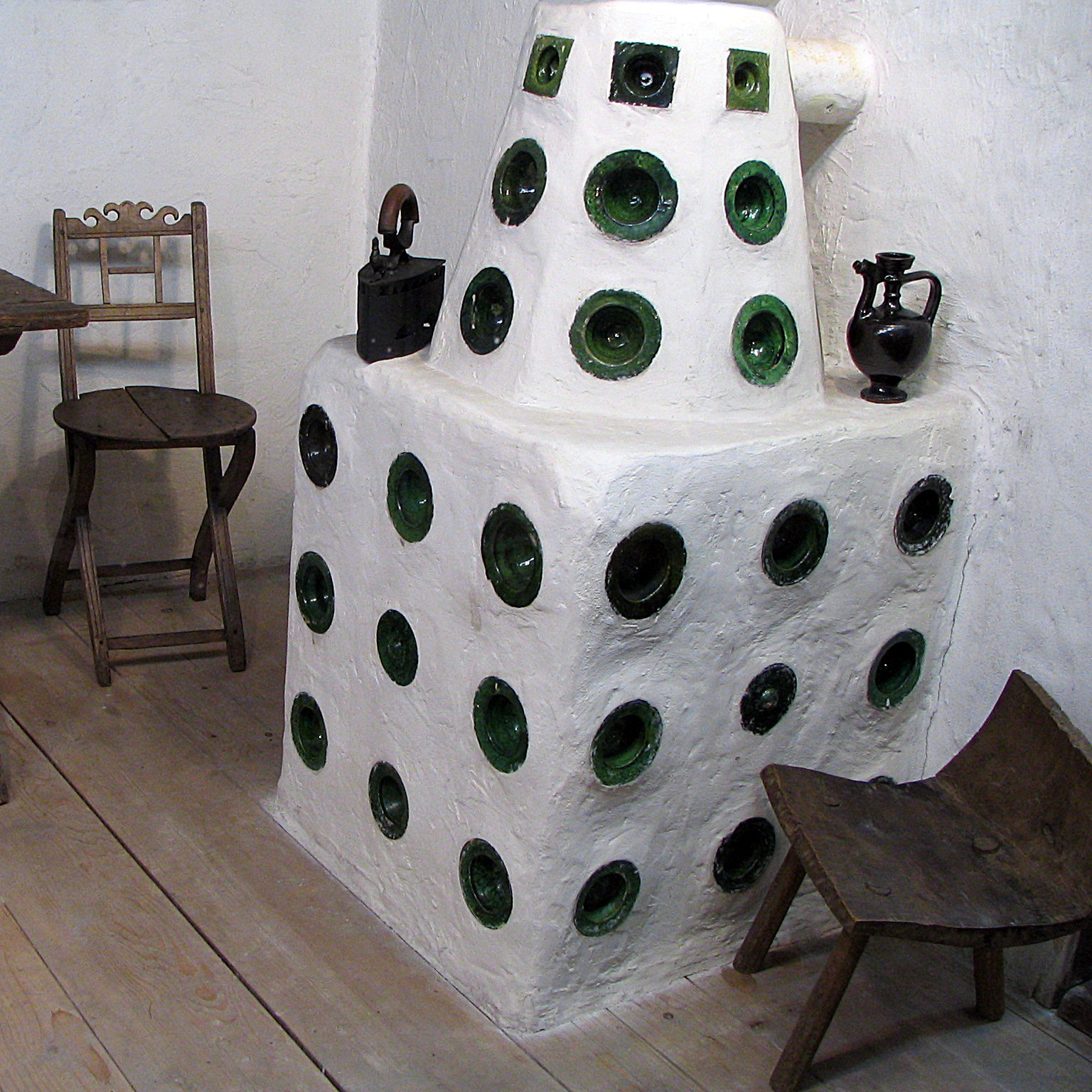
Traditional clay stove from Serbia, in the Ethnographic Museum (Belgrade, Serbia)

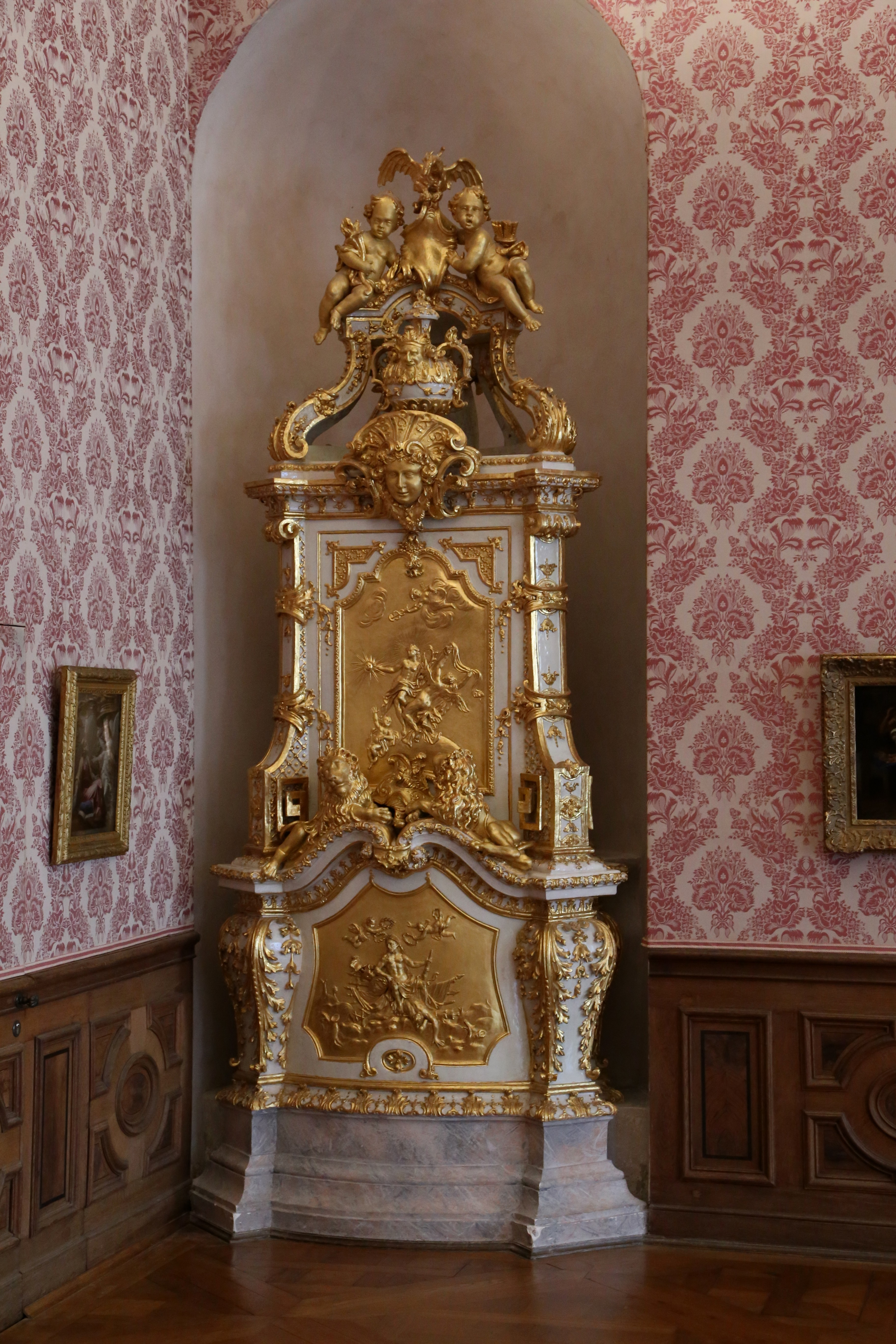
Baroque stove in the Neues Schloss Schleißheim (Germany)

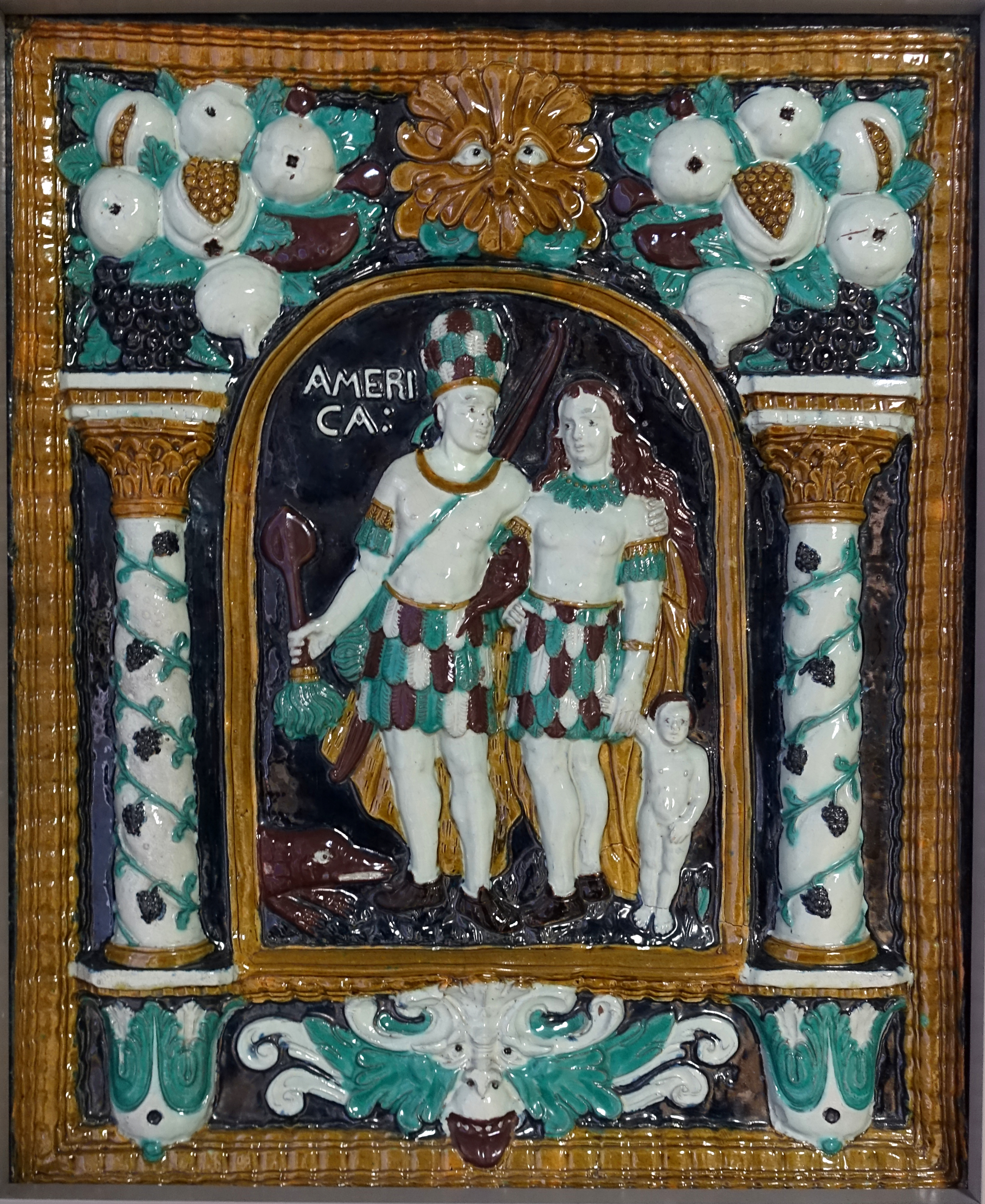
Stove tile with personification of America, from Southern Germany, c. 1650–1700, ceramic and polychrome glaze, in the Germanisches Nationalmuseum (Nuremberg, Germany)

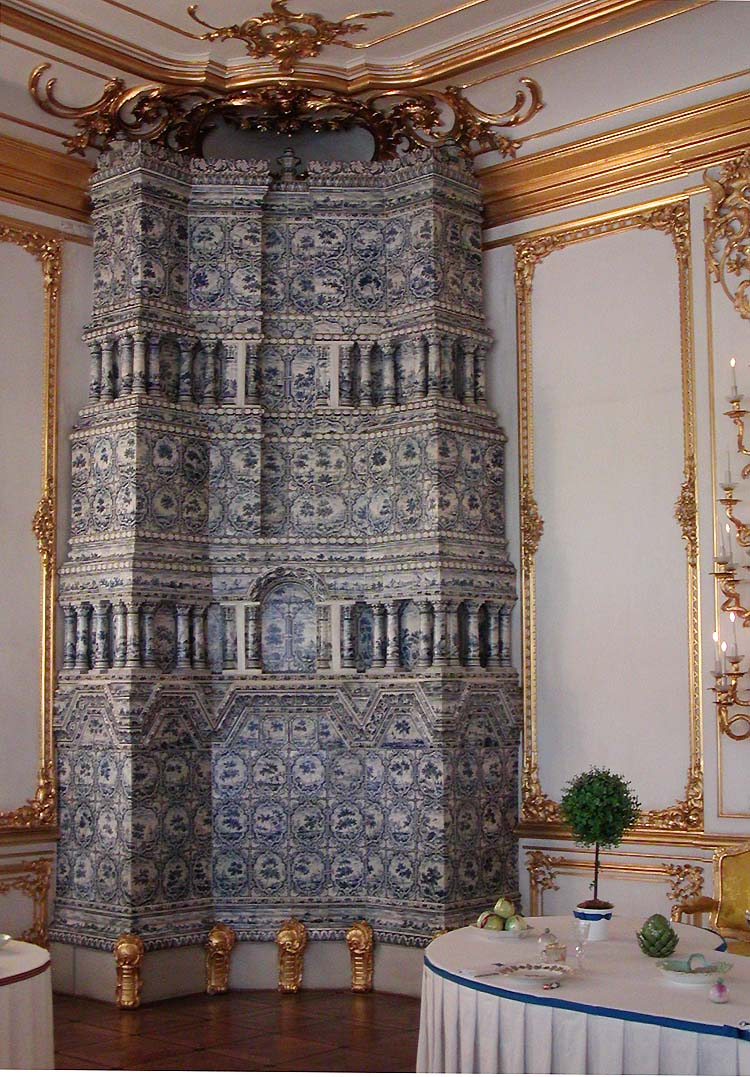
Tiled stove (for heating) in the dining room of the Catherine Palace (Saint Petersburg)

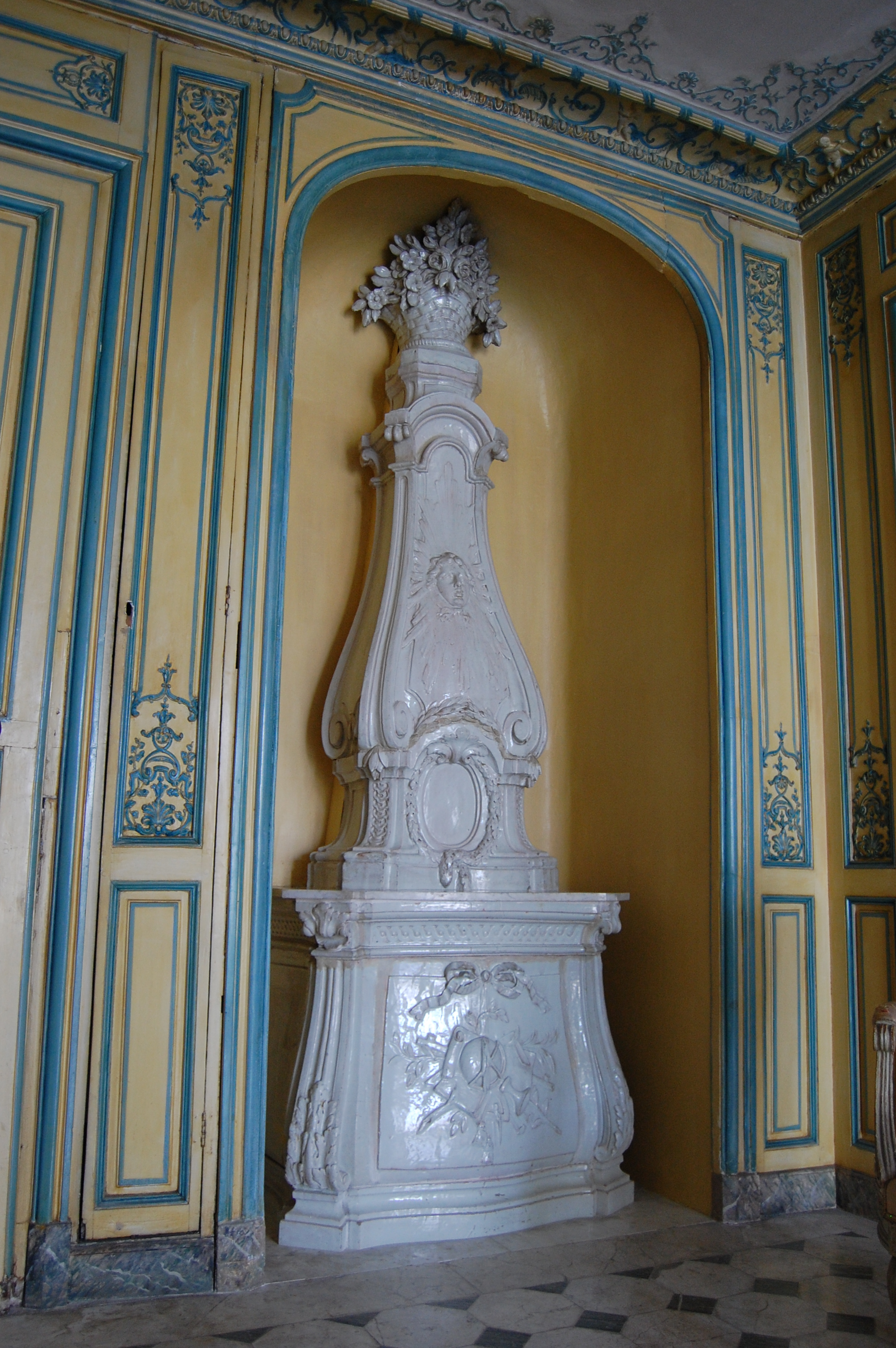
Rococo stove in the bathroom of Madame du Barry, in the Palace of Versailles (Versailles, France)

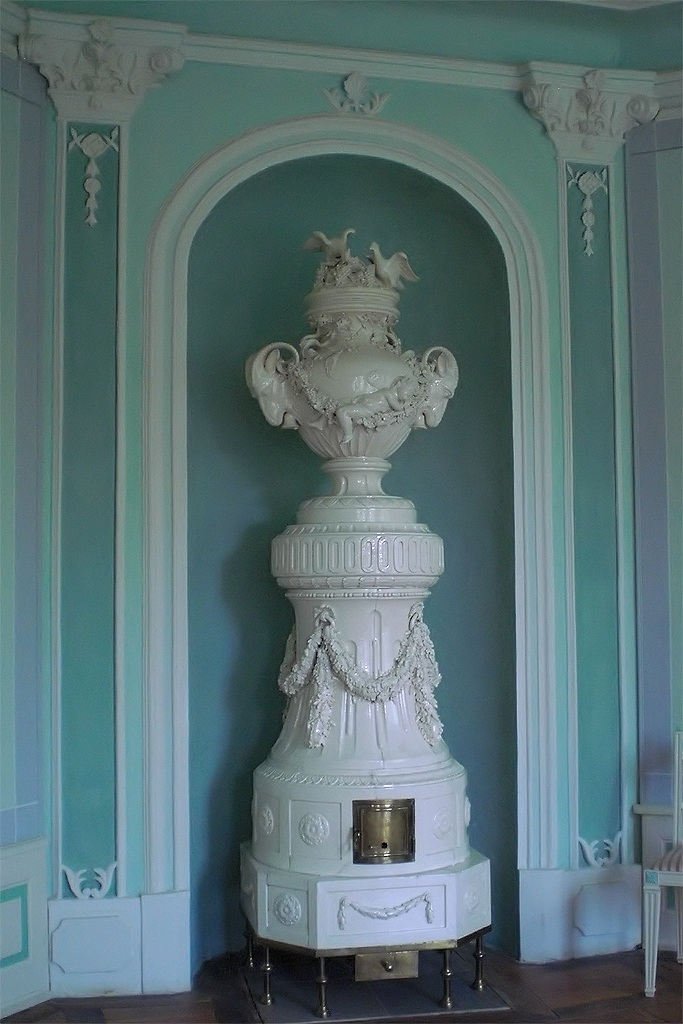
A fully Neoclassical glazed ceramic ofen (oven), early 19th century, at Schloss Wolfshagen (Prignitz, Brandenburg, Germany)

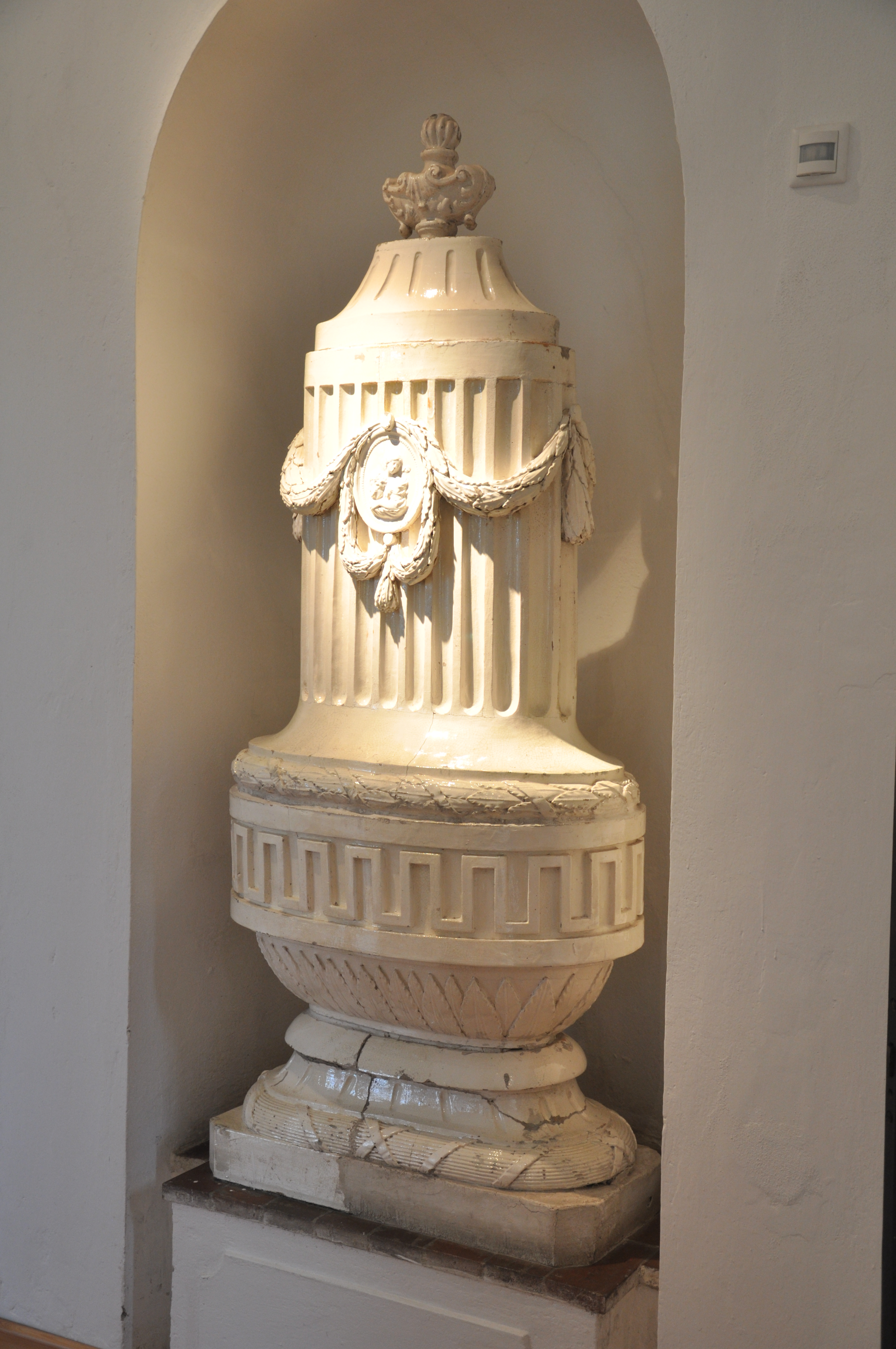
Neoclassical stove decorated with festoons, in the Schloss Senftenberg (Senftenberg, Germany)

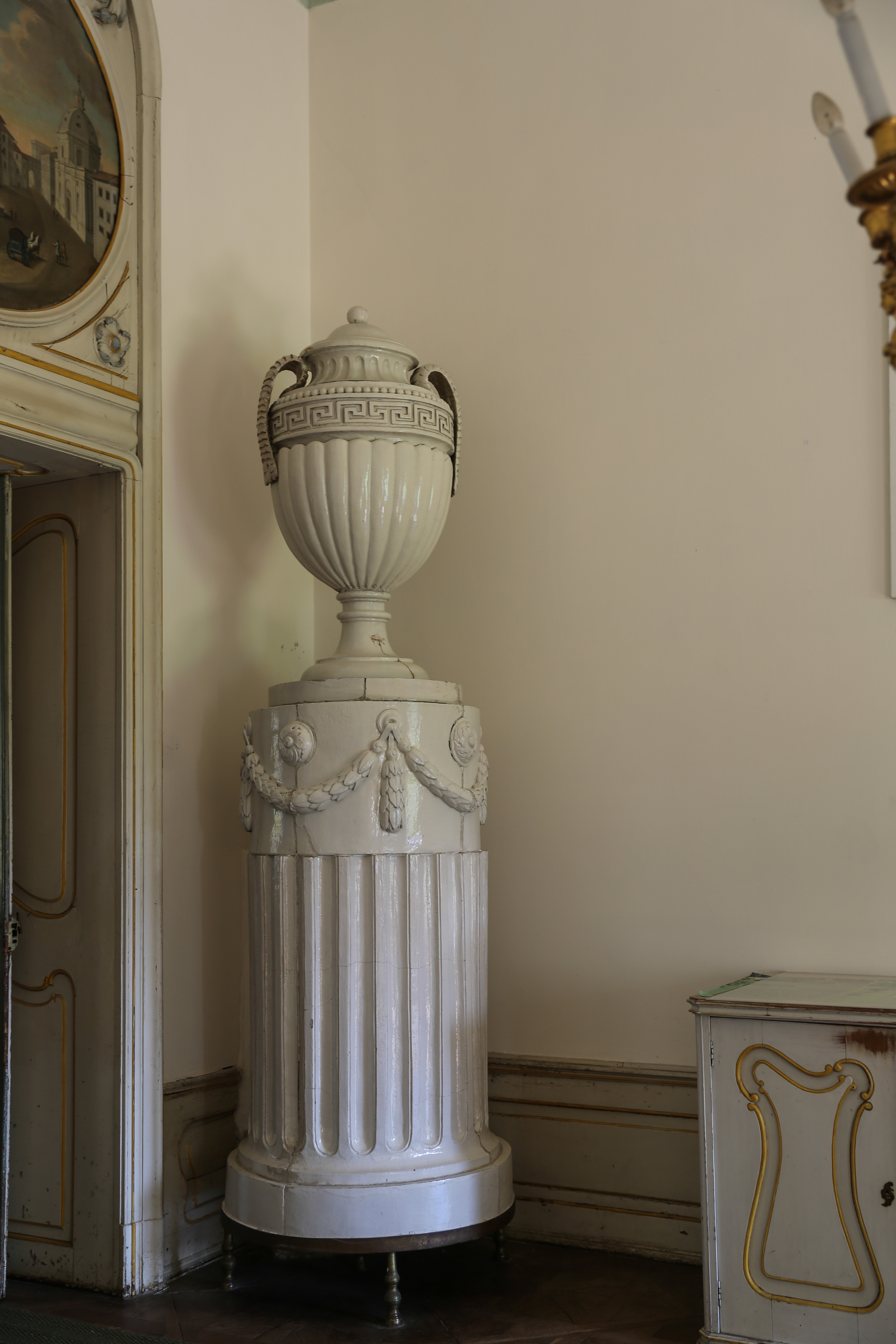
Neoclassical stove in Schloss Rosegg (Rosegg, Austria)

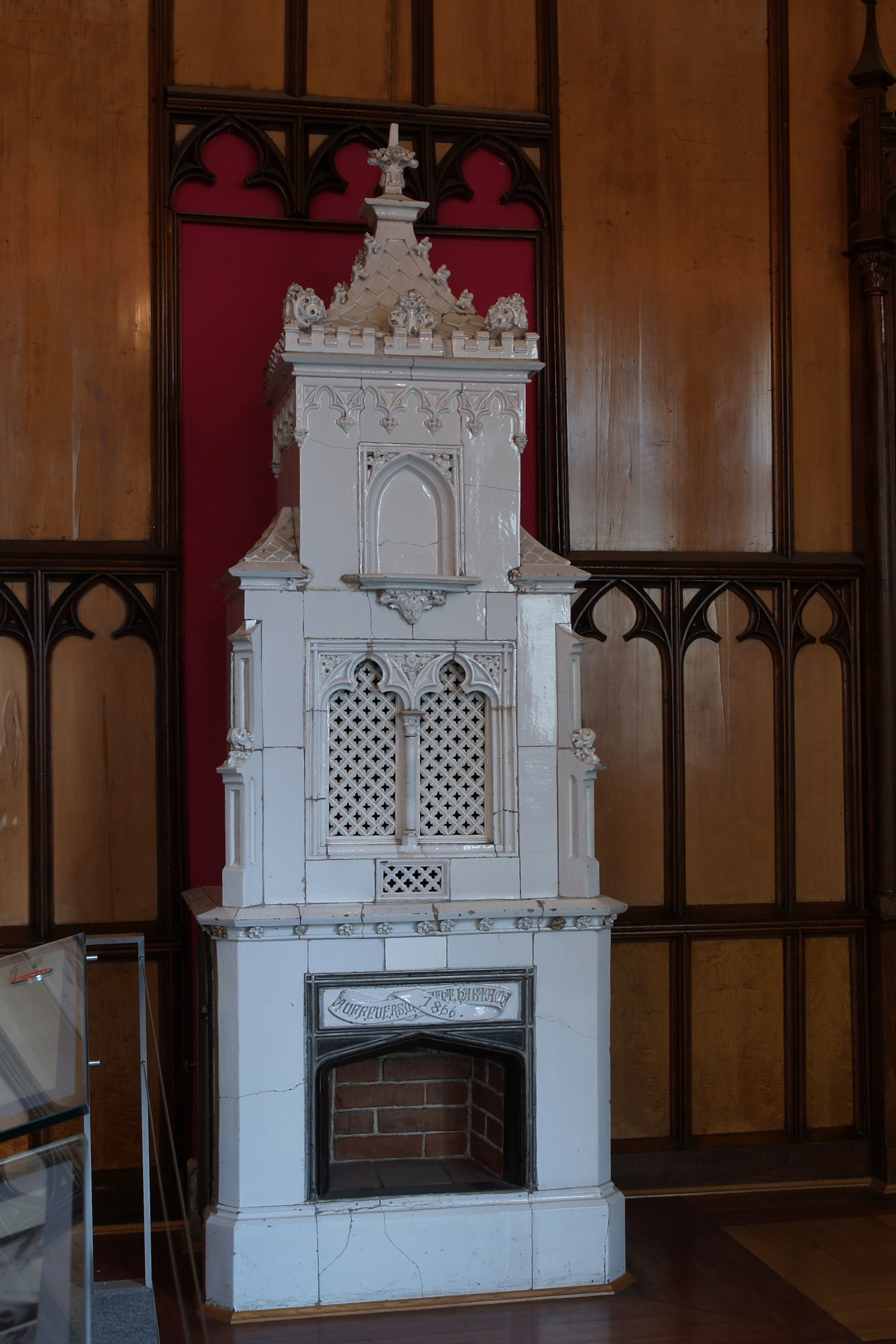
Gothic Revival stove in the Nuremberg Transport Museum (Nuremberg, Germany)

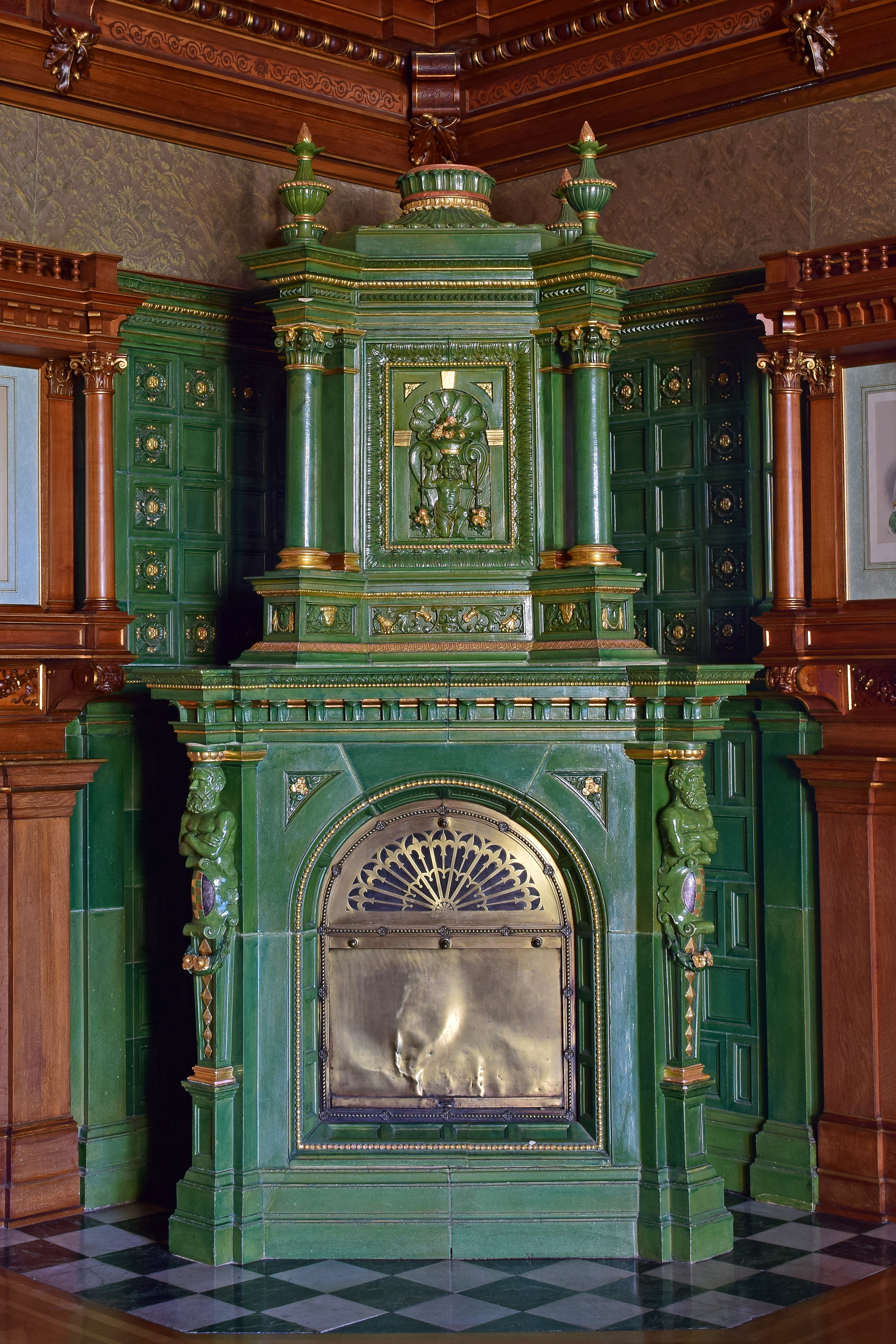
Renaissance Revival tiled stove in Schloss Grafenegg (Austria)

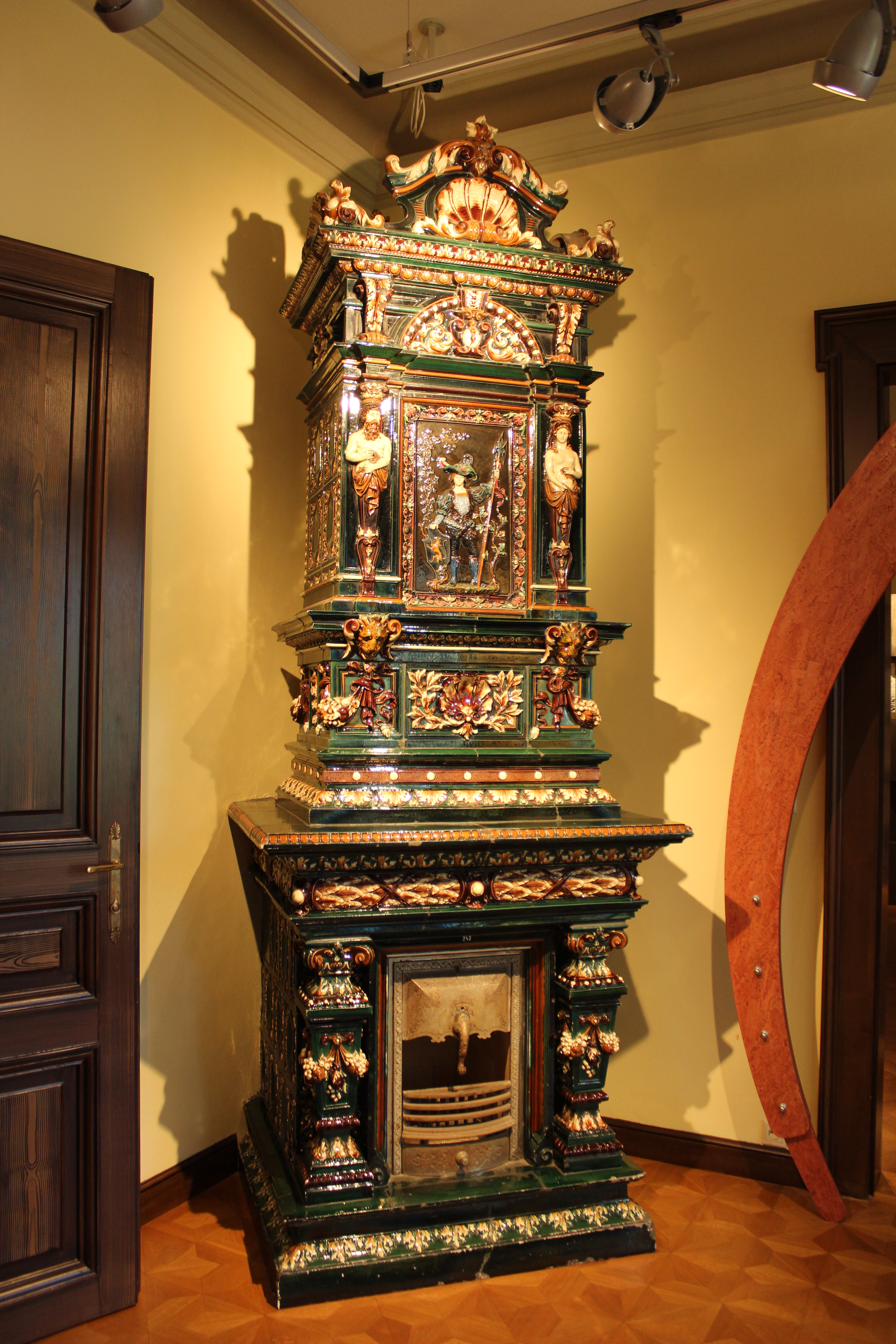
Renaissance Revival tiled stove in the Šustalova vila (Kopřivnice, Czech Republic)

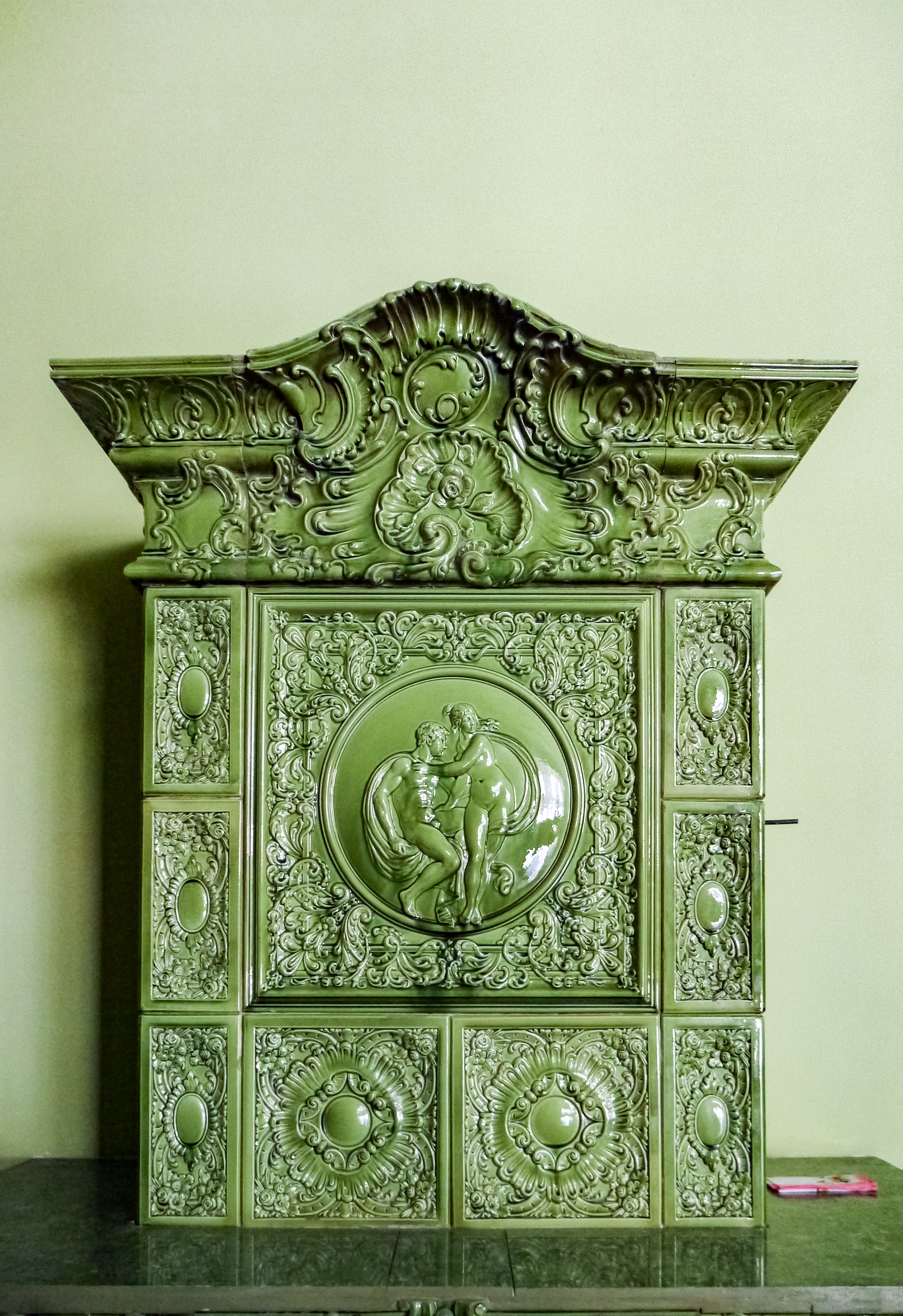
A Neo-Rococo glazed ceramic stove in Lviv (Ukraine)

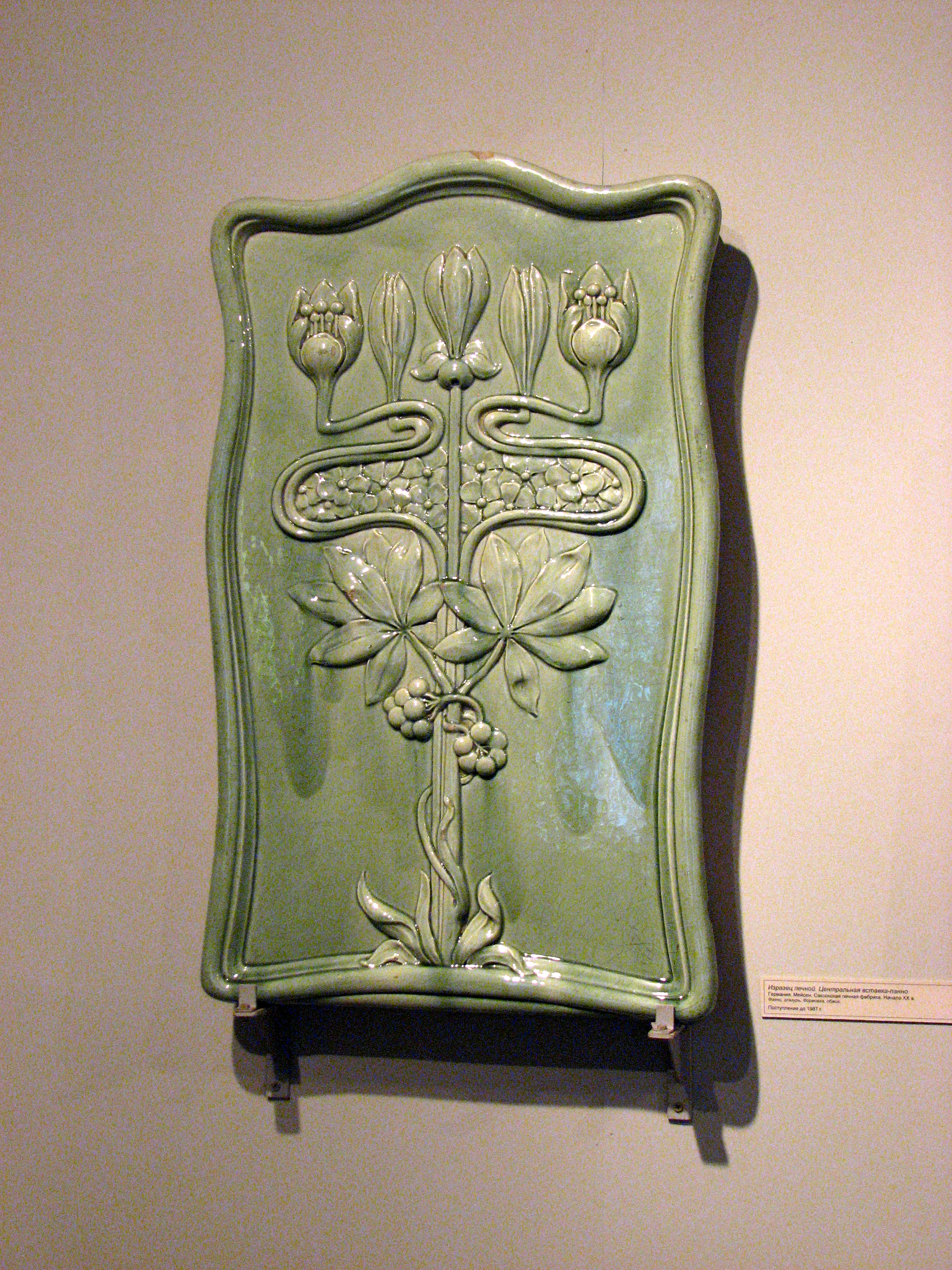
Art Nouveau stove tile, here in a Russian exhibition named «Old Petersburg»

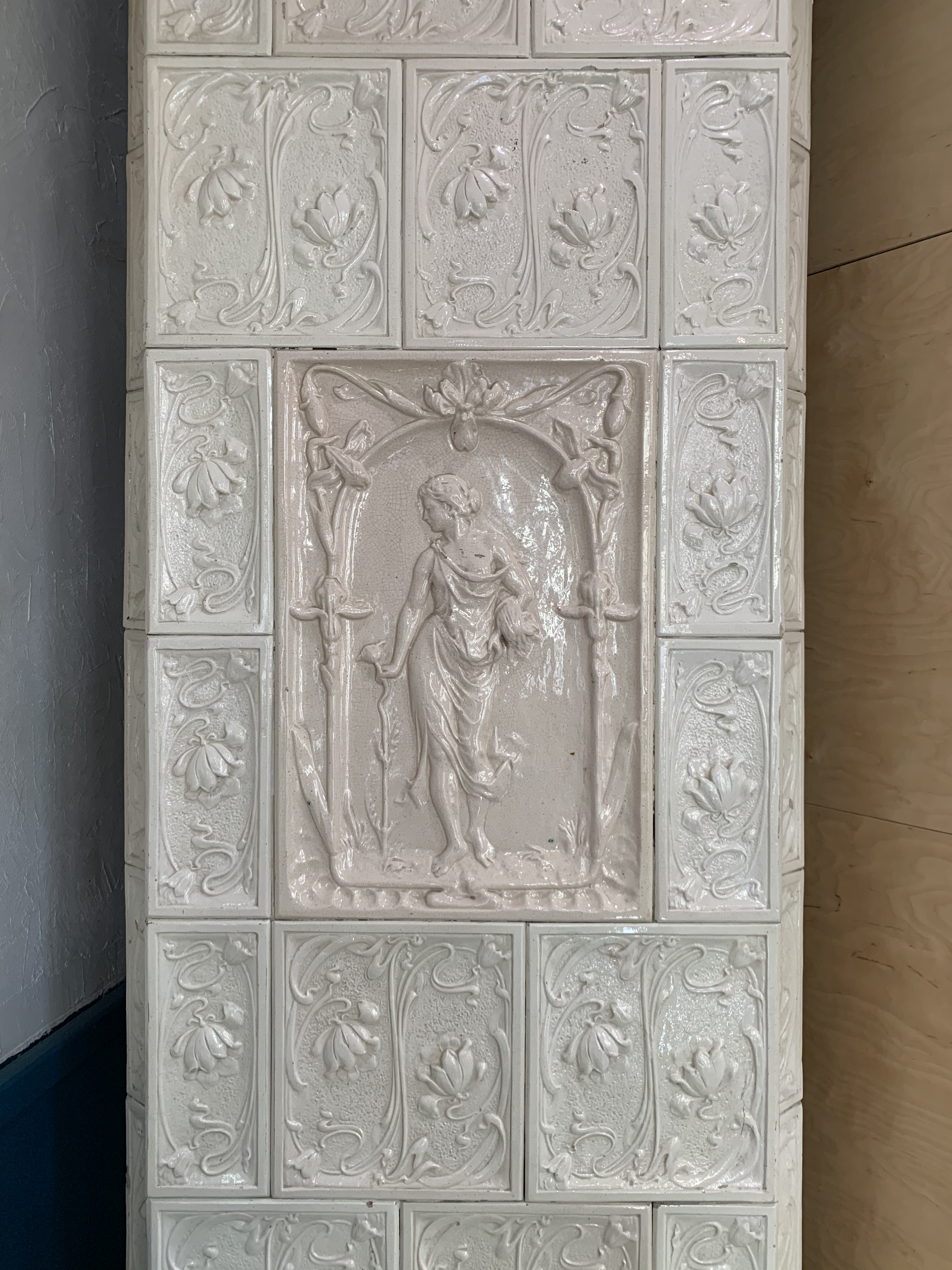
The middle part of an Art Nouveau stove in a middle-class city-house in Bucharest

=== Cast-iron ===
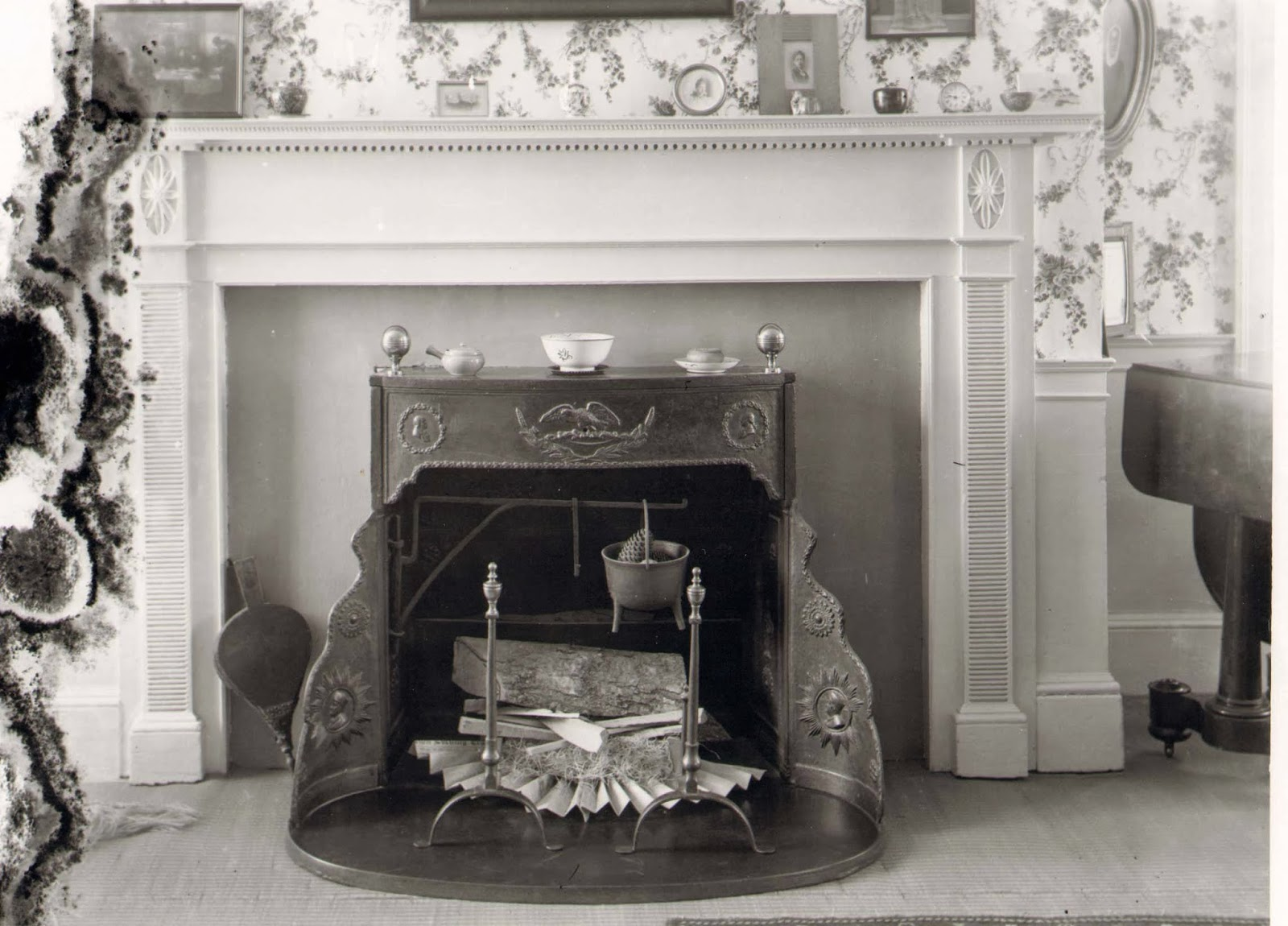
An installed Franklin stove within a fireplace

In 1642, at Lynn, Massachusetts, the first cast-iron stove was constructed. This stove was little more than a cast-iron box with no grates.

Benjamin Franklin designed the "Pennsylvania fireplace", now known as the Franklin stove in 1742, which incorporated the fundamental concepts of the heating stove. The Franklin stove used a grate to burn wood and had sliding doors to control the draught, or flow of air, through it. It had a labyrinthine path for hot exhaust gases to escape, thus allowing heat to enter the room instead of going up the chimney. Because of its compact size, the stove could be fitted to an existing fireplace or used free-standing in the middle of a room by connecting it to a chimney. Developed amid a wood shortage, it required one-quarter the quantity of fuel as a regular fireplace and could raise the room temperature more quickly. Throughout North America, the Franklin stove enjoyed widespread adoption, warming farmhouses, city residences, and frontier huts.

For cooking, Count Rumford created a cast iron oven around 1800, the Rumford roaster. This was built into a brick kitchen range. Isaac Orr of Philadelphia, Pennsylvania, created the first circular cast-iron stoves with grates for cooking meals on them roughly five years later. The potbellied stove traces its origins to the early 1800s, inspired by the Franklin stove developed twenty years prior. Jordan A. Mott designed the base-burning stove for burning anthracite coal in 1833. In 1834, Philo Stewart created the Oberlin Stove, a small wood-burning cast-iron stove. It was a compact metal kitchen stove that was far more efficient than cooking in a fireplace due to its improved heating capacity and allowance for record cooking durations. It was a huge commercial success, with some 90,000 units sold in the next 30 years, because it could be formed into desired shapes and forms and could survive temperature fluctuations from hot to cold readily. These iron stoves evolved into specialized cooking machines with chimney flue pipes, oven openings, and water heating systems. The originally open holes into which the pots were hung were now covered with concentric iron rings on which the pots were placed. Depending on the size of the pot or the heat needed, one could remove the inner rings.

=== Usage of gas ===
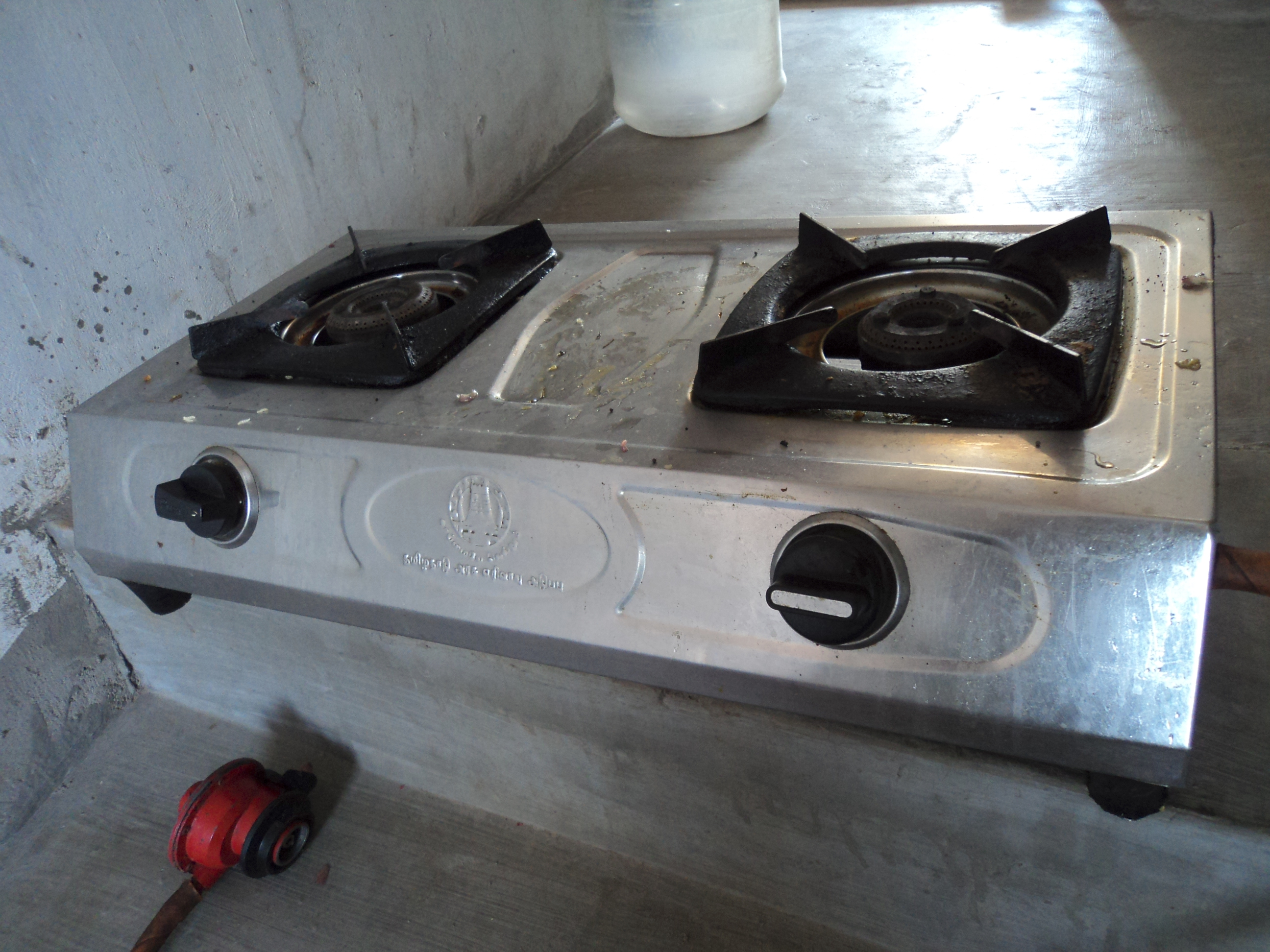
A portable gas stove.

The earliest reported use of gas for cooking, according to the Gas Museum in Leicester, England, was by a Moravian called Zachaus Winzler in 1802. However, the first commercially produced gas stove, invented by Englishman James Sharp, did not enter the market until 1834. By the end of the century, the stoves became popular because they were easier to control and required less maintenance than wood or coal stoves.

The switch to gas was prompted by concerns about air pollution, deforestation and climate change, causing the general public to reconsider the usage of coal and wood stoves. Under common-use conditions, indoor NO_{2} from gas stoves can quickly exceed US Environmental Protection Agency (EPA) and World Health Organization (WHO) 1-h exposure benchmarks in kitchen air. NO_{2} pollution has been shown to harm human health.

=== Electric stoves ===
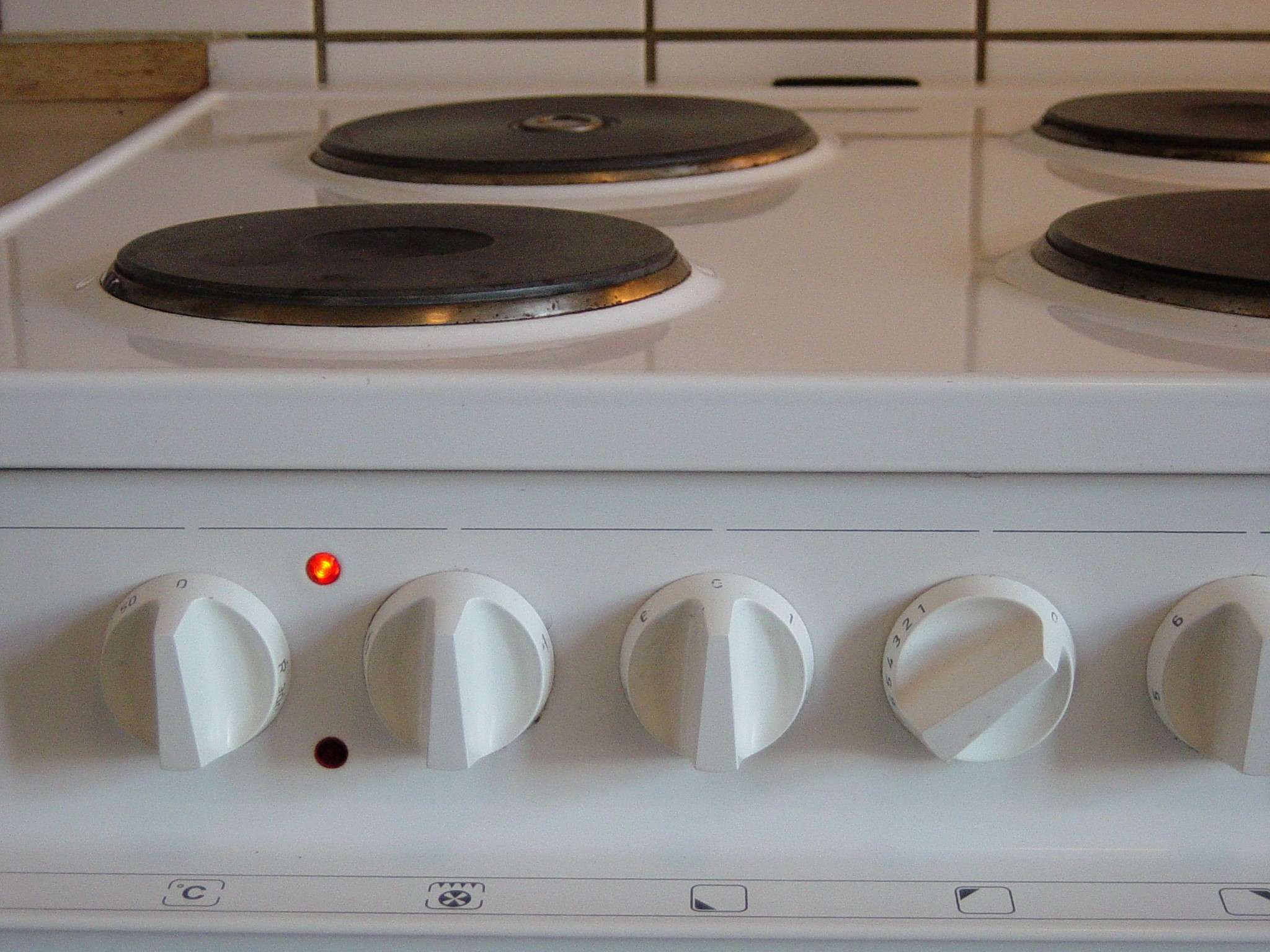
A modern-day electric stove

Electric stoves became popular not long after the advent of home electricity. One early model was created by Thomas Ahearn, the owner of a Canadian electric company, whose marketing included a demonstration meal prepared entirely with electricity at Ottawa's Windsor Hotel in 1892.

As central heating became the standard in the developed world, cooking became the primary function of stoves in the twentieth century. Iron cooking stoves that used wood, charcoal, or coal radiated too much heat, which made the kitchen unbearably hot in the summer. They were superseded in the twentieth century by steel ranges or ovens fueled by natural gas or electricity.

=== Induction ===
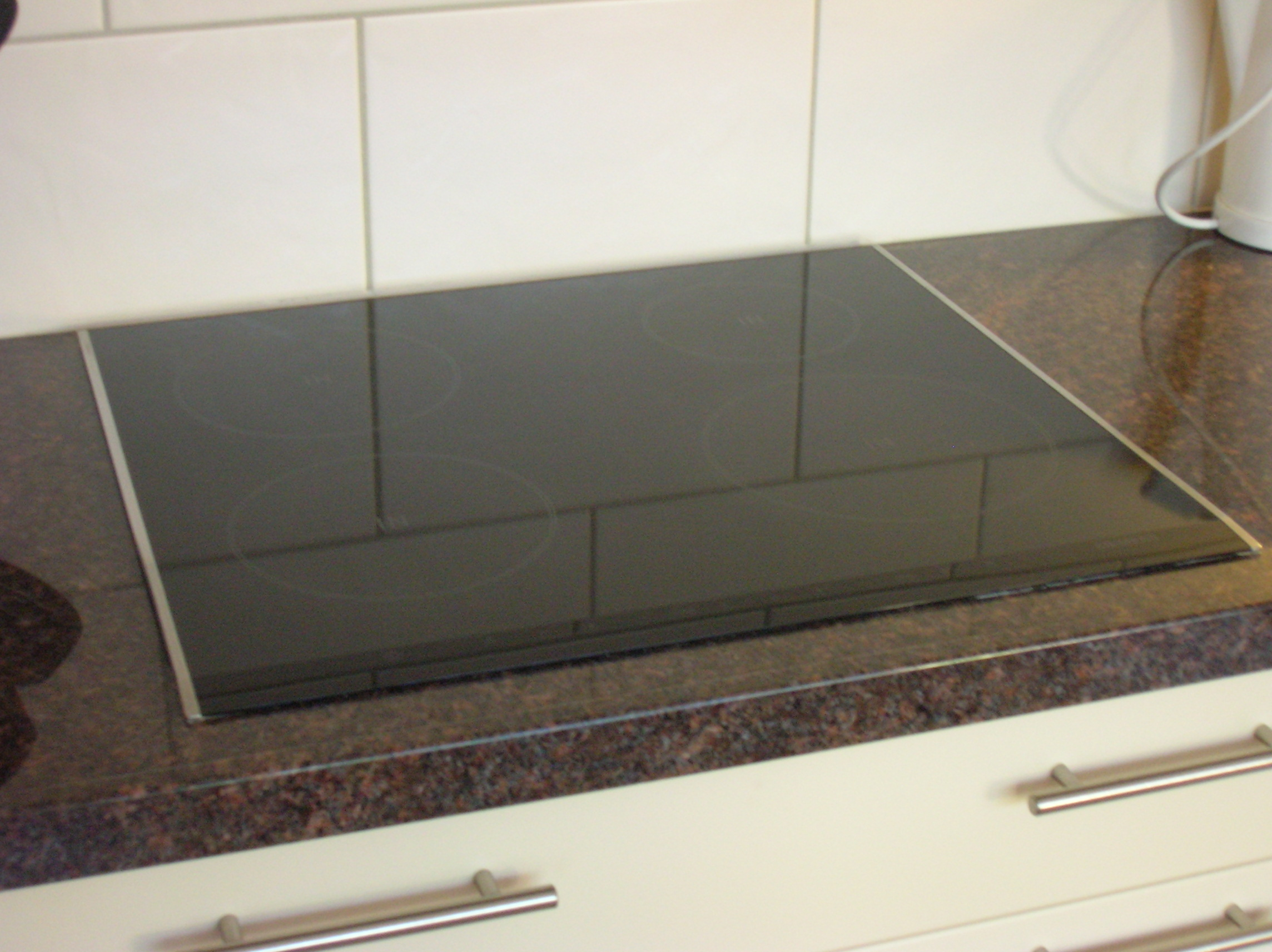
Top view of an induction cooktop

The first patents for induction stoves date from the early 1900s. Demonstration stoves were shown by the Frigidaire division of General Motors in the mid-1950s on a touring GM showcase in North America. The induction cooker was shown heating a pot of water with a newspaper placed between the stove and the pot, to demonstrate the convenience and safety. This unit, however, was never put into production.

Modern implementation in the US dates from the early 1970s, with work done at the Research & Development Center of Westinghouse Electric Corporation at Churchill Borough, near Pittsburgh. That work was first put on public display at the 1971 National Association of Home Builders convention in Houston, Texas, as part of the Westinghouse Consumer Products Division display. The stand-alone single-burner range was named the Cool Top Induction Range. It used paralleled Delco Electronics transistors developed for automotive electronic ignition systems to drive the 25 kHz current.

Westinghouse decided to make a few hundred production units to develop the market. Those were named Cool Top 2 (CT2) Induction ranges. The development work was done at the same R&D location by a team led by Bill Moreland and Terry Malarkey. The ranges were priced at $1,500 ($8,260 in 2017 dollars), including a set of high quality cookware made of Quadraply, a new laminate of stainless steel, carbon steel, aluminum and another layer of stainless steel (outside to inside).

Production took place in 1973 through to 1975 and stopped, coincidentally, with the sale of Westinghouse Consumer Products Division to White Consolidated Industries Inc. Modern-day induction stoves are sold by many manufacturers, including General Electric, LG Corporation, Whirlpool Corporation, IKEA, and Samsung.

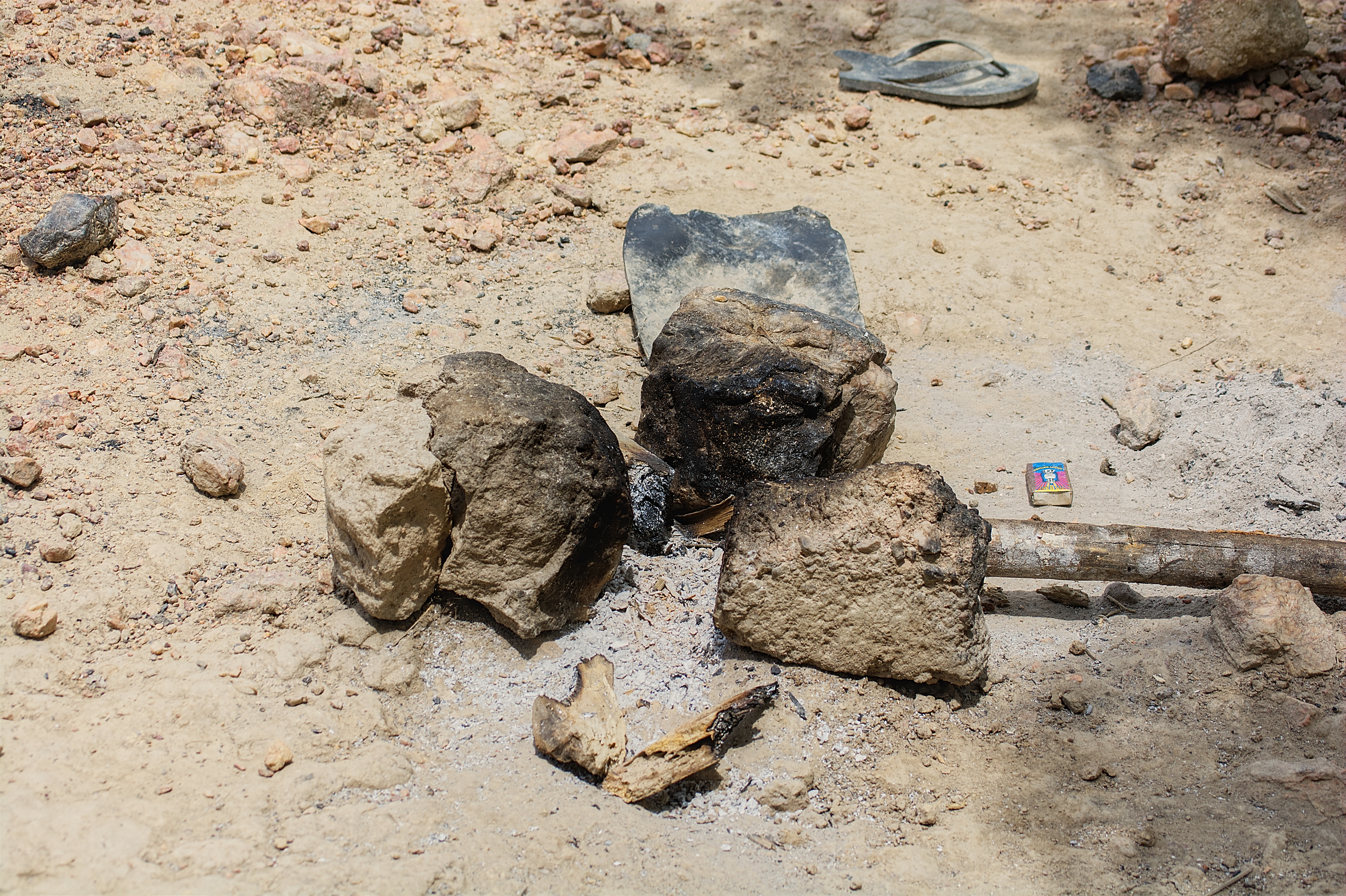
Local stove for cooking

== Types ==
=== Purpose ===
==== Cooking ====
A kitchen stove, cooker, or cookstove is a kitchen appliance designed for the purpose of cooking food. Kitchen stoves rely on the application of direct heat for the cooking process and may also contain an oven underneath or to the side that is used for baking. Traditionally these have been fueled by wood; the earliest known example of such was the Castrol stove. More modern versions such as the popular Rayburn range offer a choice between using wood or gas.

==== Heating ====
Stoves are also used for heating purposes. Benjamin Franklin's invention in 1740 popularized the widespread usage of modern heating stoves and fireplaces. Today, wood stoves are commonly used for warming homes, and are credited for their cost-effectiveness compared to coal and gas, and connection to the practices of human ancestors.

=== Fuel ===
==== Wood-burning ====
A wood-burning stove (or wood burner or log burner in the UK) is a heating or cooking appliance capable of burning wood fuel and wood-derived biomass fuel, such as sawdust bricks. Generally the appliance consists of a solid metal (usually cast iron or steel) closed firebox, often lined by fire brick, and one or more air controls (which can be manually or automatically operated depending upon the stove). The first wood-burning stove was patented in Strasbourg in 1557, two centuries before the Industrial Revolution, which would make iron an inexpensive and common material, so such stoves were high end consumer items and only gradually spread in use. Wood-burning stoves are still commonly used today in less-developed countries.

==== Coal-burning ====
The most common stove for heating in the industrial world for almost a century and a half was the coal stove that burned coal. Coal stoves came in all sizes and shapes and different operating principles. Coal burns at a much higher temperature than wood, and coal stoves must be constructed to resist the high heat levels. A coal stove can burn either wood or coal, but a wood stove might not burn coal unless a grate is supplied. The grate may be removable or an "extra".

This is because coal stoves are fitted with a grate so allowing part of the combustion air to be admitted below the fire. The proportion of air admitted above/below the fire depends on the type of coal. Brown coal and lignites evolve more combustible gases than say anthracite and so need more air above the fire. The ratio of air above/below the fire must be carefully adjusted to enable complete combustion.

Coal, particularly anthracite coal, became a popular option during the 1800s in the United States because it burned at a high heat while also producing little soot. By 1860, as much as 90% of United States homes used anthracite coal as a solution for the fuel crisis that the United States faced. One major issue with the use of coal burning stoves in the 1800s was limitations of storing the material over time. A division between the wealthy and poor in using coal stoves was that many poor families could not afford to store the volumes of coal needed to heat homes for long periods of time. Therefore, while wealthy families could store large amounts of coal in cellars, poorer families often had to purchase coal in smaller quantities. Therefore, difficulties surrounding the storage of coal helped push the use and development of gas stoves.

Anthracite stoves such as the Pither stove were gravity fed and could burn for days.

==== Gas ====
Gas stoves were first introduced by Moravian Zachaus Winzler in 1802. Today, according to the US Energy Information Administration, 35% of American households use gas stoves. They are chosen as they offer better temperature control, durability, low cost, and speed of heating. In June 2023, Stanford researchers found combustion from gas stoves can raise indoor levels of benzene, a potent carcinogen linked to a higher risk of blood cell cancers. Gas-powered stoves are criticized for environmental concerns with methane emission and the usage of natural gas, the danger of carbon monoxide release, and difficulty in cleaning. For example, a January 2022 Stanford-led study reveals that the methane leaking from gas-burning stoves has a climate impact comparable to the carbon dioxide emissions from about 500,000 gasoline-powered cars.

==== Electricity ====
The electric stove was first patented in 1859, was little used until the 1910s.

Likewise, the induction stove only became widely available in the 1970s after decades to development. These stoves are praised for their cost-effectiveness, ease of cleaning, options to control low heat, and stable base for many types and sizes of pots and other cooking tools. Critics note that abrasive cleaners can damage induction stoves, that gas has more traditional culinary associations, and that induction stoves are unable to operate during power outages. Unlike gas stoves, induction stoves have no detectable benzene emissions and any benzene emissions could then be attributed to cooking food rather than to the cooktop or fuel used.

== Efficiency ==
Compared to simple open fires, which can have efficiency of less than 10%, enclosed stoves can offer greater efficiency and control. In free air, solid fuels burn at a temperature of only about 240 °C (464 °F), which is too low a temperature for perfect combustion reactions to occur, heat produced through convection is largely lost, smoke particles are evolved without being fully burned and the supply of combustion air cannot be readily controlled.

By enclosing the fire in a chamber and connecting it to a chimney, draft (draught) is generated pulling fresh air through the burning fuel. This causes the temperature of combustion to rise to a point (600 °C or 1,112 °F) where efficient combustion is achieved, the enclosure allows the ingress of air to be regulated and losses by convection are almost eliminated. It also becomes possible, with ingenious design, to direct the flow of burned gasses inside the stove such that smoke particles are heated and destroyed.

Enclosing a fire also prevents air from being sucked from the room into the chimney. This can represent a significant loss of heat as an open fireplace can pull away many cubic meters of heated air per hour. Efficiency is generally regarded as the maximum heat output of a stove or fire, and is usually referred to by manufacturers as the difference between heat to the room and heat lost up the chimney.

An early improvement was the fire chamber: the fire was enclosed on three sides by masonry walls and covered by an iron plate. Only in 1735 did the first design that completely enclosed the fire appear: the Castrol stove of the French architect François de Cuvilliés was a masonry construction with several fireholes covered by perforated iron plates. It is also known as a stew stove. Near the end of the 18th century, the design was refined by hanging the pots in holes through the top iron plate, thus improving heat efficiency even more.

In 1743, Benjamin Franklin invented an all-metal fireplace with an attempt to improve the efficiency. It was still an open-faced fireplace, but improved on efficiency compared to old-fashioned fireplaces.

Some stoves use a catalytic converter, which causes combustion of the gas and smoke particles not previously burned. Other models use a design that includes firebox insulation, a large baffle to produce a longer, hotter gas flow path. Modern enclosed stoves are often built with a window to let out some light and to enable the user to view progress of the fire.

While enclosed stoves are typically more efficient and controllable than open fires, there are exceptions. The type of water-heating "back boiler" open fires commonly used in Ireland, for instance, can achieve more than 80% absolute efficiency.

== Modern designs ==
As concerns about air pollution, deforestation, and climate change have increased, new efforts have been made to improve stove design. The largest strides have been made in innovations for biomass-burning stoves, such as the wood-burning stoves used in many of the world's most populous countries. These new designs address the fundamental problem that wood and other biomass fires inefficiently consume large amounts of fuel to produce relatively small amounts of heat, while producing fumes that cause significant indoor and environmental pollutants. The World Health Organization has documented the significant number of deaths caused by smoke from home fires. Increases in efficiency allow users of stoves to spend less time gathering wood or other fuels, suffer less emphysema and other lung diseases prevalent in smoke-filled homes, while reducing deforestation and air pollution.

Corn and pellet stoves and furnaces are a type of biofuel stove. The shelled dry kernel of corn, also called a corn pellet, creates as much heat as a wood pellet, but generates more ash. "Corn pellet stoves and wood pellet stoves look the same from the outside. Since they are highly efficient, they don't need a chimney; instead, they can be vented outdoors by a four-inch (102 mm) pipe through an outside wall and so can be located in any room in the home."

A pellet stove is a type of clean-burning stove that uses small, biological fuel pellets which are renewable and very clean-burning. Home heating using a pellet stove is an alternative currently used throughout the world, with rapid growth in Europe. The pellets are made of renewable material — typically wood sawdust or off-cuts. There are more than half a million homes in North America using pellet stoves for heat, and probably a similar number in Europe. The pellet stove typically uses a feed screw to transfer pellets from a storage hopper to a combustion chamber. Air is provided for the combustion by an electric blower. The ignition is automatic, using a stream of air heated by an electrical element. The rotation speed of the feeder and the fan speeds can be varied to modulate the heat output.

Other efficient stoves are based on Top Lit updraft (T-LUD) or wood gas or smoke burner stove, a principle applied and made popular by Dr. Thomas Reed, which use small pieces of sticks, chips of wood or shavings, leaves, etc., as fuel. The efficiency is very high — up to 50 percent — as compared to traditional stoves that are 5 to 15 percent efficient on average.

Stoves fueled by alcohol, such as ethanol, offer another modern, clean-burning stove option. Ethanol-fueled stoves have been made popular through the work of Project Gaia in Africa, Latin America and the Caribbean.

=== Airtightness ===
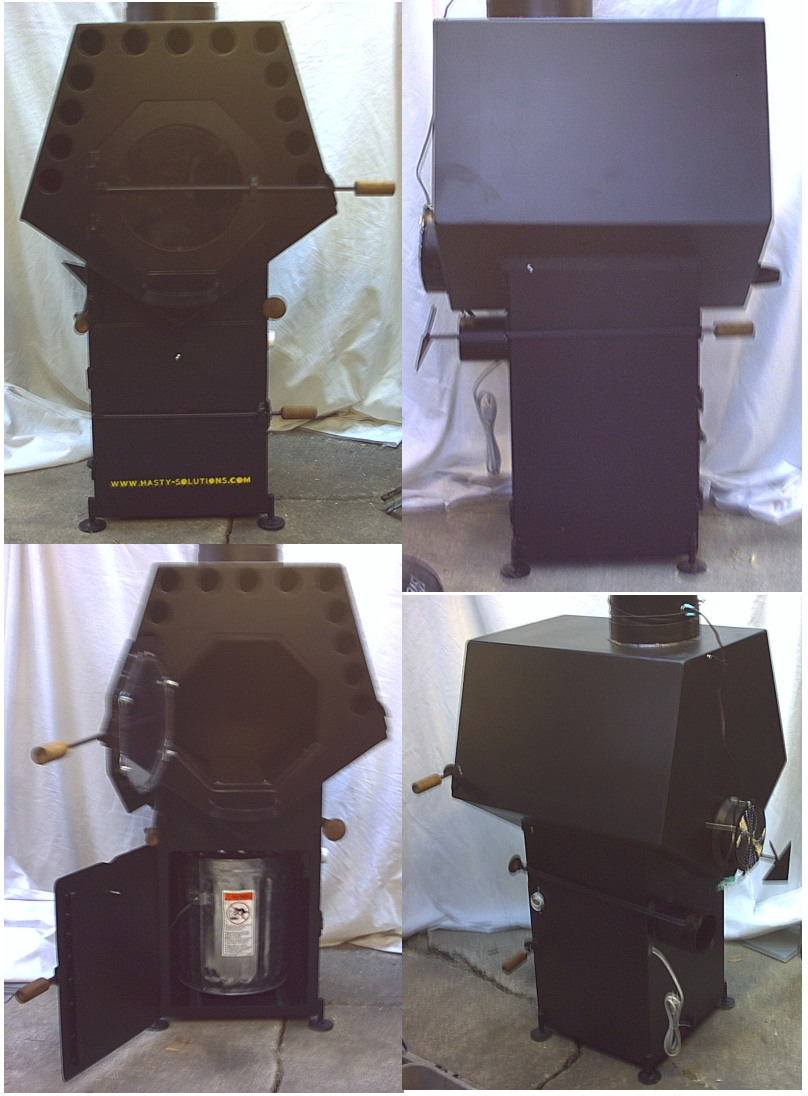
The pentagonal self-cleaning wood stove, is an EPA style secondary combustion air wood stove with a fan forced heat exchanger, thermostat, outside air intake with throttle, shakers, and ash drop for easy cleanup.

An air-tight stove is a wood-burning stove designed to burn solid fuel, traditionally wood, in a controlled fashion so as to provide for efficient and controlled fuel use, and the benefits of stable heating or cooking temperatures. They are made of sheet metal, consisting of a drum-like combustion chamber with airflow openings that can be open and shut, and a chimney of a meter or more length.

These stoves are used most often to heat buildings in winter. Wood or other fuel is put into the stove, lit, and then air flow is regulated to control the burn. The intake airflow is either at the level where fuel is added, or below it. The exhaust (smoke) from the stove is usually several meters above the combustion chamber.

Most modern air-tight stoves feature a damper at the stove's outlet that can be closed to force the exhaust through an after burner at the top of the stove, a heated chamber in which the combustion process continues. Some air-tight stoves feature a catalytic converter, a platinum grid placed at the stove outlet to burn remaining fuel that has not been combusted, as gases burn at a much lower temperature in the presence of platinum.

Using an air-tight stove initially requires leaving the damper and air vents open until a bed of coals has been formed. After that, the damper is closed and the air vent regulated to slow down the burning of the wood. A properly loaded and controlled air-tight stove will burn safely without further attention for eight hours, or longer.

These features provide a more complete combustion of wood and elimination of polluting combustion products. It also provides for regulation of the intensity of fire by limiting air flow, and for the fire to create a strong draught or draw up the chimney. This results in highly efficient fuel usage.

Air-tight stoves are a more sophisticated version of traditional wood-burning stoves.

== Emission regulation ==
Many countries legislate to control emissions. Since 2015, the United States Environmental Protection Agency (EPA) Phase III Woodstove Regulations in the United States requiring that all wood stoves being manufactured limit particulate emission to 4.5 grams per hour for stoves with after burners or 2.5 grams per hour for stoves with catalytic converters. Testing wood stove efficiency is limited to two primary methods, crib wood and cord wood. In 2020, wood stoves tested with crib wood must burn at= 2.0 grams per hour. As of 2020, efficiency tests can also be conducted with cordwood and must be below 2.5 grams of emission per hour. According to the EPA Cordwood discussion paper, these changes are aimed at improving current test methods in order to eventually develop an EPA reference method for cordwood stoves and, potentially, for central heaters (e.g., hydronic heaters/boilers and forced-air furnaces).

The burn temperature in modern stoves can increase to the point where secondary and complete combustion of the fuel takes place. A properly fired masonry heater has little or no particulate pollution in the exhaust and does not contribute to the buildup of creosote in the heater flues or the chimney. Some stoves achieve as little as 1 to 4 grams of emissions per hour. This is roughly 10% as much smoke than older stoves, and equates to nearly zero visible smoke from the chimney. This is largely achieved through causing the maximum amount of material to combust, which results in a net efficiency of 60 to 70%, as contrasted to less than 30% for an open fireplace. Net efficiency is defined as the amount of heat energy transferred to the room compared to the amount contained in the wood, minus any amount central heating must work to compensate for airflow problems.

== Research and development ==
The search for safer, cleaner stoves remains to many an important if low-profile area of modern technology. Cook stoves in common use around the world, particularly in Third World countries, are considered fire hazards and worse: according to the World Health Organization, a million and a half people die each year from indoor smoke inhalation caused by faulty stoves. An engineer's "Stove Camp" has been hosted annually since 1999 by Aprovecho Research Center (Oregon, US) with the intent of designing a cheap, efficient, and healthy cook stove for use around the world. Other engineering societies (see Envirofit International, Colorado, US) and philanthropic groups (see the Bill & Melinda Gates Foundation, California) continue to research and promote improved cook stove designs. A focus on research and development on improved heating stoves is ongoing and was on display at the 2013 Wood Stove Decathlon in Washington, D.C.

== See also ==
- Foot stove
- List of cooking appliances
- List of stoves
- Multi-fuel stove
- Pellet baskets
- Portable stove
