= Seiko Matsuda albums discography =

- Studio albums: 55
- EPs: 1
- Soundtrack albums: 7
- Compilation albums: 44
- Singles: 82
- Video albums: 61
- Remix albums: 2
- Box sets: 9

Japanese singer-songwriter Seiko Matsuda has released fifty-five studio albums, forty-four compilation albums, six soundtracks, two remix albums, one extended plays, and eight box sets.

Seiko released her debut album, Squall in August 1980; it peaked at number two in Japan and has sold over 500,000 copies. The second single from the album, "Aoi Sangoshou" became the fifteenth best-selling single of 1979 in Japan. Her second album, North Wind, was released later in the year and became Matsuda's first number one album. One of her best-selling and critically acclaimed albums, Pineapple was released in 1982. The album peaked at number one in Japan and spawned two number one singles. In 1983, Matsuda released her most successful studio album to date, Utopia, which became the third best-selling album of the year in Japan. Her first English-language album, Sound of My Heart was released in 1985. The album was produced by Phil Ramone and peaked at number two in Japan. Her fifteenth studio album, Citron, which was produced by David Foster, was released in 1988 and became Matsuda's twelfth number one studio album.

Matsuda's global debut album, Seiko was released in 1990. The album has spawned a hit single, "The Right Combination". The single, which features the guest vocals by American singer Donnie Wahlberg, reached top 20 in Australia and Canada, as well as charting in Japan, the United States, and the United Kingdom. Matsuda's eleventh compilation album, Bible was released in 1991 and has been certified double platinum by the Recording Industry Association of Japan. In 1996, Matsuda released her twenty-seventh studio album, Vanity Fair. The album spawned her best-selling single, "Anata ni Aitakute: Missing You", and peaked at number two in Japan. Her third global album, Area 62 was released in 2002. The album has spawned two Billboard Dance Club Songs top twenty singles. Matsuda released the compilation album, We Love Seiko: 35th Anniversary Seiko Matsuda Kyūkyoku All-Time Best 50 Songs, which became her first top three album in 19 years. Her first jazz album, Seiko Jazz was released in 2017 through Verve Records and peaked at number six in Japan.

Matsuda is one of the best-selling music artists in Japan, having sold over 30 million records nationwide.

== Studio albums ==
Title	Album details	Peak chart positions		Sales	Certifications
Title	Album details	JPN	JPN LP	Sales	Certifications
Squall	Released: August 1, 1980; Label: CBS Sony; Formats: LP, cassette, CD, digital download	64	2	JPN: 547,000	
North Wind	Released: December 1, 1980; Label: CBS Sony; Formats: LP, cassette, CD, digital download	74	1	JPN: 389,000	
Silhouette	Released: May 21, 1981; Label: CBS Sony; Formats: LP, cassette, CD, digital download	68	2	JPN: 380,000	
Kaze Tachinu	Released: October 21, 1981; Label: CBS Sony; Formats: LP, cassette, CD, digital download	52	1	JPN: 366,000	
Pineapple	Released: May 21, 1982; Label: CBS Sony; Formats: LP, cassette, CD, digital download	49	1	JPN: 594,000	
Candy	Released: November 10, 1982; Label: CBS Sony; Formats: LP, cassette, CD, digital download	63	1	JPN: 541,000	
Utopia	Released: June 1, 1983; Label: CBS Sony; Formats: LP, cassette, CD, digital download	50	1	JPN: 652,000	
Canary	Released: December 10, 1983; Label: CBS Sony; Formats: LP, cassette, CD, digital download	73	1	JPN: 635,000	
Tinker Bell	Released: June 10, 1984; Label: CBS Sony; Formats: LP, cassette, CD, digital download	89	1	JPN: 507,000	
Windy Shadow	Released: December 8, 1984; Label: CBS Sony; Formats: LP, cassette, CD, digital download	85	1	JPN: 699,000	
The 9th Wave	Released: June 5, 1985; Label: CBS Sony; Formats: LP, cassette, CD, digital download	90	1	JPN: 788,000	
Sound of My Heart (as Seiko)	Released: August 15, 1985; Label: CBS Sony; Formats: LP, cassette, CD, digital download	112	2	JPN: 526,000	
Supreme	Released: June 1, 1986; Label: CBS Sony; Formats: LP, cassette, CD, digital download	93	1	JPN: 567,000	
Strawberry Time	Released: May 16, 1987; Label: CBS Sony; Formats: LP, cassette, CD, digital download	99	1	JPN: 437,000; HKG: 10,000	IFPI Hong Kong: Gold
Citron	Released: May 11, 1988; Label: CBS Sony; Formats: LP, cassette, CD, digital download	1	1	JPN: 370,000	
Precious Moment	Released: December 6, 1989; Label: CBS Sony; Formats: CD, cassette, digital download	6	—	JPN: 200,000	RIAJ: Gold
Seiko (as Seiko)	Released: June 7, 1990; Label: CBS Sony; Columbia; Formats: CD, cassette, LP, digital download	2	—	JPN: 200,000	RIAJ: Gold
We Are Love	Released: December 10, 1990; Label: CBS Sony; Formats: CD, cassette, digital download	3	—	JPN: 200,000	RIAJ: Gold
Eternal	Released: May 2, 1991; Label: Sony; Formats: CD, cassette, MD, digital download	3	—	JPN: 167,000	
1992 Nouvelle Vague	Released: March 25, 1992; Label: Sony; Formats: CD, cassette, MD, digital download	8	—	JPN: 200,000	RIAJ: Gold
Sweet Memories '93	Released: December 2, 1992; Label: Sony; Formats: CD, cassette, digital download	12	—	JPN: 84,000	
Diamond Expression	Released: May 21, 1993; Label: Sony; Formats: CD, cassette, MD, digital download	4	—	JPN: 200,000	RIAJ: Gold
A Time for Love	Released: November 21, 1993; Label: Sony; Formats: CD, cassette, MD, digital download	21	—	JPN: 66,000	
Glorious Revolution	Released: June 12, 1994; Label: Sony; Formats: CD, cassette, MD, digital download	8	—	JPN: 92,000	
It's Style '95	Released: May 21, 1995; Label: Sony; Formats: CD, cassette, MD, digital download	2	—	JPN: 273,000	RIAJ: Gold
Was It the Future (as Seiko)	Released: May 14, 1996 (US) June 10, 1996 (JPN); Label: Mercury; A&M; Formats: CD, cassette, digital download	12	—	JPN: 47,000	
Vanity Fair	Released: May 27, 1996; Label: Mercury; Formats: CD, digital download	2	—	JPN: 410,000; HKG: 10,000	RIAJ: Platinum; IFPI Hong Kong: Gold
My Story	Released: May 21, 1997; Label: Mercury; Formats: CD, digital download	5	—	JPN: 200,000	RIAJ: Gold
Sweetest Time	Released: May 21, 1997; Label: Mercury; Formats: CD, digital download	23	—	JPN: 31,000	
Forever	Released: May 8, 1998; Label: Mercury; Formats: CD, digital download	12	—	JPN: 96,000	
Eien no Shōjo	Released: December 18, 1999; Label: Mercury; Formats: CD, digital download	24	—	JPN: 30,000	
20th Party	Released: June 28, 2000; Label: Mercury; Formats: CD, digital download	16	—	JPN: 29,000	
Love & Emotion Vol. 1	Released: June 20, 2001; Label: Universal; Formats: CD, digital download	19	—	JPN: 25,000	
Love & Emotion Vol. 2	Released: November 28, 2001; Label: Universal; Formats: CD, digital download	43	—	JPN: 7,000	
Area62 (as Seiko)	Released: June 11, 2002 (US) June 21, 2002 (JPN); Label: Hip-O Records; Formats: CD	—	—		
Sunshine	Released: June 9, 2004; Label: Sony; Formats: CD, digital download	6	—	JPN: 51,000	
Fairy	Released: April 6, 2005; Label: Sony; Formats: CD, digital download	7	—	JPN: 29,000	
I'll Fall in Love	Released: August 26, 2005 (TWN); Label: Sony; Formats: CD, digital download	—	—		
Under the Beautiful Stars	Released: December 7, 2005; Label: Sony; Formats: CD, digital download	34	—	JPN: 11,000	
Bless You	Released: May 31, 2006; Label: Sony; Formats: CD, digital download	14	—	JPN: 17,000	
Eternal II	Released: December 6, 2006; Label: Sony; Formats: CD, digital download	52	—	JPN: 6,000	
Baby's Breath	Released: June 6, 2007; Label: Sony; Formats: CD, digital download	19	—	JPN: 23,000	
My Pure Melody	Released: May 21, 2008; Label: Sony; Formats: CD, digital download	15	—	JPN: 20,000	
My Prelude	Released: May 26, 2010; Label: Universal; Formats: CD, digital download	4	—	JPN: 24,000	
Cherish	Released: June 1, 2011; Label: Universal; Formats: CD, digital download	10	—	JPN: 19,000	
Very Very	Released: June 6, 2012; Label: Universal; Formats: CD, digital download	9	—	JPN: 21,000	
A Girl in the Wonder Land	Released: June 5, 2013; Label: Universal; Formats: CD, digital download	5	—	JPN: 20,000	
Dream & Fantasy	Released: June 4, 2014; Label: Universal; Formats: CD, digital download	5	—	JPN: 20,000	
Bibbidi-Bobbidi-Boo	Released: June 10, 2015; Label: Universal; Formats: CD, digital download	6	—	JPN: 18,000	
Shining Star	Released: June 8, 2016; Label: EMI; Formats: CD, digital download	5	—	JPN: 18,000	
Seiko Jazz	Released: March 29, 2017; Label: EMI; Verve; Formats: CD, digital download	6	—	JPN: 23,000	
Daisy	Released: June 7, 2017; Label: EMI; Formats: CD, digital download	5	—	JPN: 15,000	
Merry-Go-Round	Released: June 6, 2018; Label: EMI; Formats: CD, digital download	10	—	JPN: 15,000	
Seiko Jazz 2	Released: February 20, 2019; Label: EMI; Verve; Formats: CD, digital download	11	—	JPN: 11,000	
Seiko Matsuda 2020	Released: September 30, 2020; Label: EMI; Formats: CD, digital download	3	—	JPN: 39,000	
Seiko Matsuda 2021	Released: October 20, 2021; Label: EMI; Formats: CD, digital download	4	—	JPN: 27,000	
Seiko Jazz 3	Released: February 14, 2024; Label: EMI; Formats: CD, digital download	11	—	JPN: 7,596	
"—" denotes releases that did not chart or was not released

== Reissues ==
Title	Album details	Peak chart positions	Sales
Title	Album details	JPN	Sales
Seiko Matsuda 2020: Deluxe Edition	Released: October 20, 2021; Label: EMI; Formats: CD, digital download	21	JPN: 2,000

== Compilation albums ==
Title	Album details	Peak chart positions	Sales	Certifications
Title	Album details	JPN	Sales	Certifications
Seiko Fragrance	Released: November 1, 1981; Label: CBS Sony; Formats: LP, cassette	3	JPN: 547,000	
Seiko Index	Released: July 1, 1982; Label: CBS Sony; Formats: CD, LP, cassette	3	JPN: 444,000	
Kinniro no Ribbon	Released: December 5, 1982; Label: CBS Sony; Formats: CD, LP, cassette	1	JPN: 260,000	
Seiko Plaza	Released: November 11, 1983; Label: CBS Sony; Formats: CD, LP, cassette	1	JPN: 510,000	
Touch Me, Seiko	Released: March 15, 1984; Label: CBS Sony; Formats: CD, LP, cassette	1	JPN: 340,000	
Seiko Town	Released: November 1, 1984; Label: CBS Sony; Formats: CD, LP, cassette	1	JPN: 357,000	
Seiko Avenue	Released: November 21, 1984; Label: CBS Sony; Formats: CD	—		
Seiko-Train	Released: March 6, 1985; Label: CBS Sony; Formats: CD, LP	1	JPN: 208,000	
Seiko-Train	Released: March 6, 1985; Label: CBS Sony; Formats: CD, LP	1	JPN: 208,000	
Love Ballade	Released: November 21, 1986; Label: CBS Sony; Formats: CD, LP, cassette	5	JPN: 104,000	
Snow Garden	Released: November 21, 1987; Label: CBS Sony; Formats: CD, LP, cassette	1	JPN: 294,000; HKG: 10,000	IFPI Hong Kong: Gold
Seiko Monument	Released: July 21, 1988; Label: Sony; Formats: CD	10	JPN: 74,000	
Christmas Tree	Released: November 21, 1991; Label: Sony; Formats: CD, cassette	9	JPN: 96,000	
Bible	Released: December 1, 1991; Label: Sony; Formats: CD, cassette	8	JPN: 302,000	RIAJ: 2×Platinum
Bible II	Released: December 1, 1994; Label: Sony; Formats: CD	14	JPN: 230,000	RIAJ: Gold
Bible III	Released: March 1, 1996; Label: Sony; Formats: CD	16	JPN: 114,000	
Winter Tales	Released: November 1, 1996; Label: Sony; Formats: CD	44	JPN: 28,000	
Seaside: Summer Tales	Released: June 21, 1997; Label: Sony; Formats: CD	—		
Dear	Released: November 21, 1997; Label: Sony; Formats: CD	27	JPN: 32,000	RIAJ: Gold
Seiko Celebration	Released: July 18, 1998; Label: Sony; Formats: CD	—		
Seiko '96-'98	Released: December 2, 1998; Label: Mercury; Formats: CD	57	JPN: 10,000	
Ballad: 20th Anniversary	Released: April 1, 1999; Label: Sony; Formats: CD	—		
"Love" Seiko Matsuda 20th Anniversary Best Selection	Released: November 29, 2000; Label: Universal; Formats: CD	22	JPN: 37,000	
Super Selection	Released: 2000; Label: Sony; Formats: CD	—		
Another Side of Seiko 27	Released: November 27, 2003; Label: Sony; Formats: CD	44	JPN: 12,000	
Best of Best 27	Released: April 14, 2004; Label: Sony; Formats: CD	8	JPN: 57,000	
"Seiko Smile": Seiko Matsuda 25th Anniversary Best Selection	Released: January 26, 2005; Label: Sony; Formats: CD	26	JPN: 21,000	
Diamond Bible	Released: September 30, 2009; Label: Sony; Formats: CD	19	JPN: 14,000	
Seiko Matsuda Christmas Songs	Released: November 11, 2009; Label: Sony; Formats: CD	39	JPN: 5,000	
Touch Me, Seiko II	Released: September 22, 2010; Label: Sony; Formats: CD	94	JPN: 2,000	
Seiko Story: 80's Hits Collection	Released: December 7, 2011; Label: Sony Direct; Formats: CD	23	JPN: 31,000	RIAJ: Gold
Seiko Matsuda Super Hit Collection	Released: February 23, 2012; Label: Sony Direct; Formats: CD	95	JPN: 3,000	
Seiko Matsuda Super Hit Collection 2	Released: February 23, 2012; Label: Sony Direct; Formats: CD	207	JPN: 1,000	
Étranger	Released: May 30, 2012; Label: Sony Direct; Formats: CD	71	JPN: 3,000	
Calendar	Released: November 7, 2012; Label: Sony Direct; Formats: CD	67	JPN: 2,000	
Seiko Matsuda Best Ballad	Released: December 24, 2014; Label: Sony Direct; Formats: CD	106	JPN: 3,000	
We Love Seiko: 35th Anniversary Seiko Matsuda Kyūkyoku All-Time Best 50 Songs	Released: December 9, 2015; Label: Universal; Formats: CD	3	JPN: 116,000	RIAJ: Gold
Seiko Matsuda Sweet Days	Released: January 31, 2018; Label: Sony Direct; Formats: CD	23	JPN: 7,000	
Seiko Memories: Masaaki Omura Works	Released: February 28, 2018; Label: Sony Direct; Formats: CD	31	JPN: 4,000	
Seiko Story: 90s-00s Hits Collection	Released: August 7, 2019; Label: Sony Direct; Formats: CD	32	JPN: 3,000	
40th Anniversary Bible: Blooming Pink	Released: April 1, 2020; Label: Sony Direct; Formats: LP	23		
Seiko Matsuda 40th Anniversary Bible: Bright Moment	Released: February 14, 2021; Label: Sony Direct; Formats: LP	32		
Bible: Milky Blue/Bible: Pink & Blue – Special edition	Released: October 25, 2023; Label: Sony Direct; Formats: LP, CD	20		
Eternal Idol, Eternal Youth, Seiko Matsuda: 45th Anniversary Ultimate All-Time Best	Released: June 4, 2025; Label: Universal; Formats: 2×CD, digital	2	JPN: 20,715	
"—" denotes releases that did not chart or was not released

== Soundtrack albums ==
Title	Album details	Peak chart positions	Sales
Title	Album details	JPN	Sales
Nogiku no Haka	Released: August 8, 1981; Label: CBS Sony; Formats: CD, LP, cassette	8	JPN: 93,000
Plumeria no Densetsu	Released: July 1, 1983; Label: Sony; Formats: CD, LP, cassette	1	JPN: 166,000
Natsufuku no Eve: Freeze & Sky	Released: July 7, 1984; Label: Sony; Formats: CD, LP, cassette	7	JPN: 76,000
Caribe, Sinfonia de Amor	Released: July 7, 1984; Label: Sony; Formats: CD, LP, cassette	19	JPN: 38,000
Penguin's Story: Koufuku Monogatari	Released: June 21, 1985; Label: CBS Sony; Formats: CD, LP, cassette	5	JPN: 106,000
Goya...Uta de Tsuzuru Shogai (with Plácido Domingo)	Released: May 21, 1989; Label: Sony; Formats: CD	49	JPN: 9,000
Seiko Matsuda Original Soundtrack 1981-1985	Released: August 11, 2010; Label: Sony Records; Formats: CD	195	

== Remix albums ==
Title	Album details	Peak chart positions	Sales
Title	Album details	JPN	Sales
Seiko Matsuda: Re-Mixes	Released: October 6, 1999; Label: Mercury; Formats: CD	100	JPN: 2,000
Seiko Remixes 2000	Released: September 27, 2000; Label: Universal; Formats: CD	97	JPN: 2,400

== Extended plays ==
Title	Album details	Peak chart positions	Sales
Title	Album details	JPN	Sales
Guardian Angel	Released: May 27, 1996; Label: Mercury; Formats: CD	10	JPN: 70,000

== Tribute albums ==
Title	Album details
Carabelli Plays Seiko	Released: August 25, 1983; Label: Epic Sony; Formats: CD, LP, cassette
SUPREME Sound Portrait (Shigeaki Saegusa)	Released: October 5, 1986; Label: Epic Sony; Formats: CD, LP, cassette
Romantique	Released: December 21, 1991; Label: Sony; Formats: CD
Seiko Ballads: Sweet Memories	Released: April 14, 2004; Label: Sony; Formats: CD
Jewel Songs: Seiko Matsuda Tribute & Covers	Released: December 23, 2006; Label: Sony; Formats: CD
Memories: Songs for the Season of White	Released: December 15, 2010; Label: Sony; Formats: CD
Memories: Goodbye and Hello	Released: May 18, 2011; Label: Sony; Formats: CD
Memories: Bitter Sweet Pineapple	Released: August 24, 2011; Label: Sony; Formats: CD
Memories: the Last Leaf	Released: November 23, 2011; Label: Sony; Formats: CD
Voice: Seiyuutachi ga Utau Seiko Matsuda Song Male/Female edition	Released: November 9, 2020; Label: Sony; Formats: CD
"—" denotes releases that did not chart or was not released

== Box sets ==
Title	Album details	Peak chart positions	Sales
Title	Album details	JPN	Sales
Seiko Box	Released: November 10, 1985; Label: CBS Sony; Formats: CD	7	JPN: 6,400
Complete Bible	Released: September 21, 1996; Label: Sony; Formats: CD	45	JPN: 13,000
Seiko Matsuda 1980-1995	Released: April 1, 1997; Label: Sony Direct; Formats: CD	—	
Seiko Suite	Released: July 5, 2000; Label: Sony; Formats: CD	40	JPN: 10,000
Seiko Matsuda	Released: July 19, 2006; Label: Sony; Formats: CD	96	JPN: 2,000
Premium Diamond Bible	Released: Sep 30, 2009; Label: SMR; Formats: CD		
Seiko Matsuda Single Collection 30th Anniversary Box: The Voice of a Queen	Released: May 26, 2010; Label: Sony; Formats: CD	140	JPN: 1,000
Seiko Matsuda Original Soundtrack Collection 1981-1985	Released: May 26, 2010; Label: Sony; Formats: CD	195	JPN: 700
Seiko Matsuda Sweet Collection 80's Hits	Released: December 3, 2012; Label: Sony Direct; Formats: CD	—	
"—" denotes releases that did not chart or was not released

== See also ==
- List of best-selling albums in Japan
