= Shōwa nostalgia =

Nostalgia for the Shōwa era

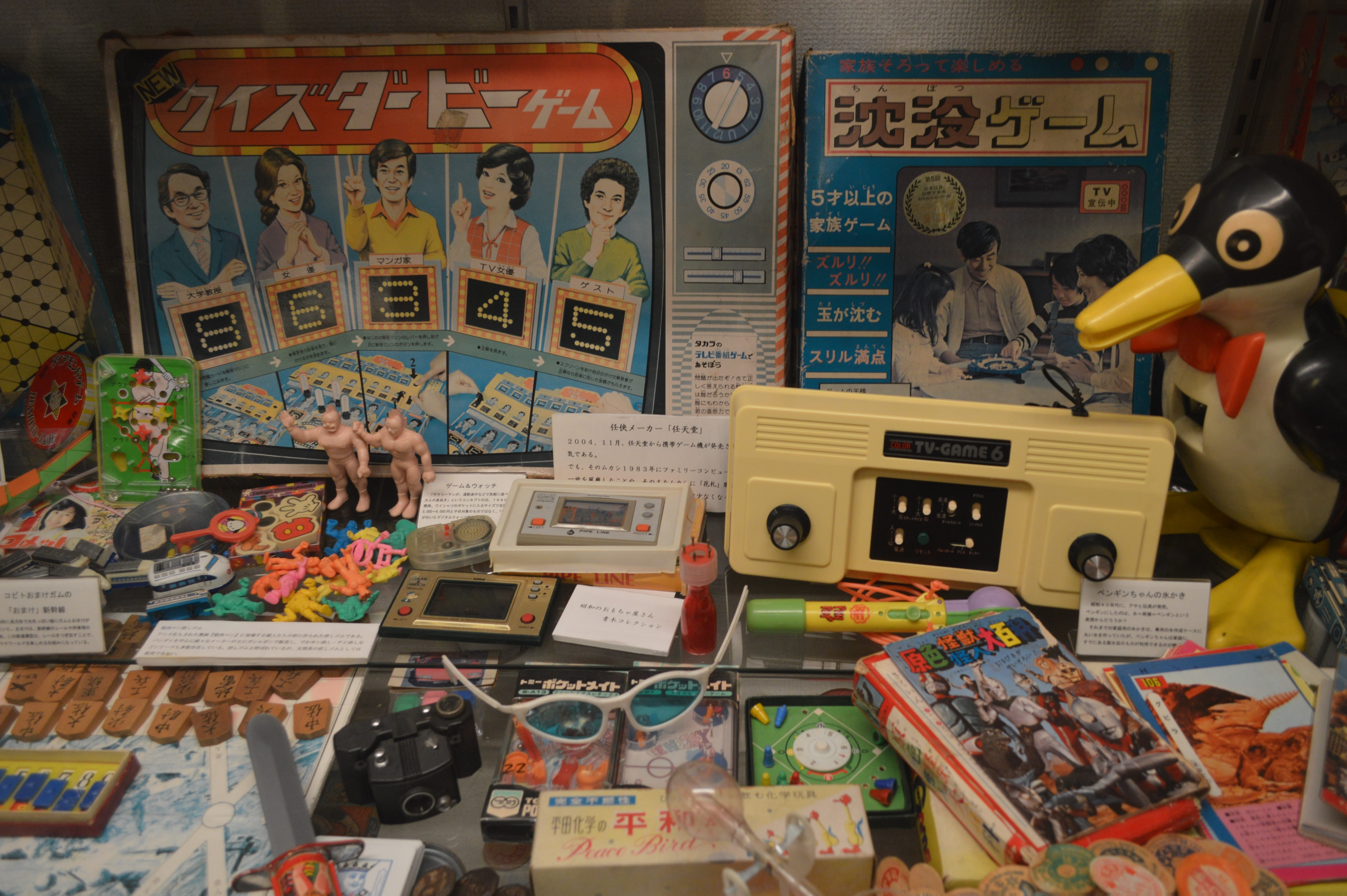
Display at the Shōwa Retro Packaging Museum, Ōme

Shōwa nostalgia (Japanese: 昭和ノスタルジア) includes nostalgia for certain aspects of the postwar Shōwa era. Shōwa retro (昭和レトロ) is retro related to the Shōwa era. The Shōwa retro boom (昭和レトロブーム) includes increased popularity and sales of Shōwa retro goods and services. The expression also loosely includes increased popularity of some things from the early part of the Heisei era. The beginnings of periods of increased nostalgia have been dated to 1974, 1986, 2005, 2012 and 2017.

== Overview ==
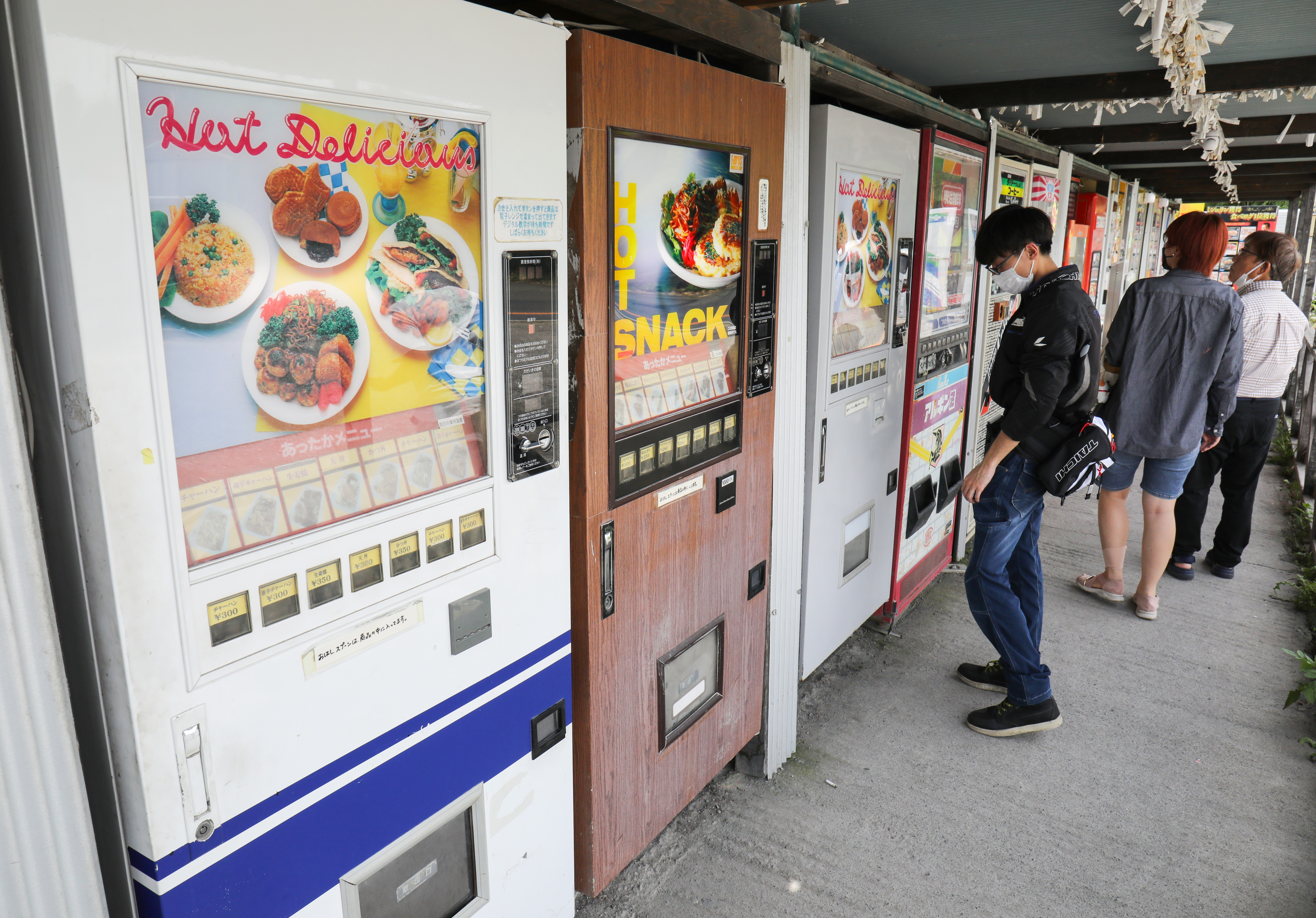
Retro vending machines at Sagamihara Vending Machine Park

As of 2017, three quarters of the Japanese population were born in the Shōwa era. By 2004, the expression "the good old Shōwa days" (古き良き昭和, furuki yoki Shōwa) was in use.

Neo Shōwa (ネオ昭和) is a fusion of the culture of the past Shōwa and current Reiwa eras.

Enthusiasm for Shōwa retro is not confined to people who remember the Shōwa era. Shōwa retro is popular with Generation Z, who were born after the Shōwa era. Enthusiasm for Shōwa retro is not confined to Japan or to Japanese people. As of 2024, there is a Shōwa retro boom in Thailand, where people are enthusiastic about Shōwa era Japanese drama and anime. Shōwa nostalgia includes anemoia.

It has been said that Shōwa retro is popular with Generation Y.

It has been said that the Shōwa nostalgia boom was preceded by Meiji and Taishō nostalgia, which existed circa 1950.

It has been said that nostalgia for the Shōwa 30s existed by 1971. In 2011, Thompson said that nostalgia seemed to be centred on the Shōwa 30s (1955 to 1964). There was said to be a Shōwa 30s boom (Japanese: 昭和30年代ブーム). In 2016, Hidaka said that nostalgia seemed to be centred on 1968 and the rest of the Shōwa 40s (1965 to 1974). In 2024, Kohei Takano said the retro boom that began in 2017 is centred on the 1980s, the end of the Shōwa era, and the start of the Heisei era.

Shōwa nostalgia has been followed by, and exists alongside, Heisei retro (Japanese: 平成レトロ) which is nostalgia for certain aspects of, and retro related to, the Heisei era. Heisei retro includes, in particular, nostalgia for the later part of the 1990s, of which the music of Nanase Aikawa, for example, is said to be particularly representative.

== Film and television ==
Manifestations of Shōwa nostalgia include television programmes about the Shōwa era, such as Takeda Tetsuya no Shōwa wa kagayaiteita (2013 onwards), Himekuri Taimu Toraberu (2007 to 2011) and most of the original series of Purojekuto Ekkusu: Chōsensha Tachi (2000 to 2005).

It has been said that the film Always: Sunset on Third Street (2005) caused a period of increased Shōwa nostalgia. The film From Up on Poppy Hill (2011) is nostalgic about 1963 Japan. The film's director, Goro Miyazaki, said that he was nostalgic about late 1950s to early 1960s Japan. Other Shōwa nostalgia films include Hula Girls (2006) and Tokyo Tower: Mom and Me, and Sometimes Dad (2007). There are Shōwa nostalgia films about the 300 million yen robbery.

Shōwa nostalgia is the subject matter of the anime film Crayon Shin-chan: The Storm Called: The Adult Empire Strikes Back (2001). The film 20th Century Boys (2008) is similar. The television programme Banpaku no Taiyo (2024) has Shōwa retro content depicting the time before and during Expo '70.

Oshin (1983 to 1984) was a nostalgia television programme that covered the Shōwa era. Kono Mune Ippai No Ai Wo (English: A Heartful of Love) (2005) is a nostalgia film set in 1986. Sukiyaki (2026) is a nostalgic biopic of three Shōwa era people.

Television programmes made in the Shōwa era, before self-imposed restrictions by the industry, are popular with young people. Extremely Inappropriate! (2024) satirizes the excessive safety of Reiwa era television by contrasting it with Shōwa era television. As of 2023, Takeshi's Castle (1986 to 1990) is popular with young people and got a new season on Amazon Prime Video. There is nostalgia for Choudenshi Bioman (1984 to 1985) in South Korea.

There is a Shōwa 100th anniversary film festival (Japanese:昭和100年映画祭).

== Music ==
It has been said that the resurgence of city pop began with nostalgic crate digging by Japanese DJs at the end of the 20th century. It has been said that the city pop boom was the beginning of a period of increased interest in Shōwa retro. Older people are nostalgic about the songs "Mayonaka no Door" (1979) and "Plastic Love" (1984). It has been said that the interest of young people in Shōwa retro came to public attention around 2017 when, amongst other things, a dance that uses the song "Dancing Hero (Eat You Up)" (1985) became popular. As of 2024, there is nostalgia for the artists Meiko Nakahara and Saki Kubota, who created songs in the new music genre in the 1980s. It has been said there is a "Shōwa song boom" (昭和歌謡ブーム) and that Shōwa era kayōkyoku songs have become popular among young people. Episodes of The Best Ten have been rebroadcast in Japan and the Shōwa era music of Akina Nakamori and Seiko Matsuda, Yoko Minamino and others, has become popular in South Korea. There is nostalgia for the Shōwa era kayōkyoku songs of Momoe Yamaguchi. The 2023 music video for ClariS' cover version of "Samishii Nettaigyo" (1989) is an homage to Wink, the original artists. A performance in Tokyo in 2024 of a cover version of "Aoi Sangoshou" (1980) by Korean band NewJeans went viral in South Korea and Japan. AKB48 (2005 onwards) re-used ideas from Onyanko Club (1985 to 1987), both of whom were produced by Yasushi Akimoto. As of 2023, the song "Gakuen Tengoku" (1974) was popular on TikTok. As of 2022, the song "Friends" (1985) by Rebecca, and the song "Roman Hikō" (from a 1987 album), were popular on Spotify. There have been karaoke rankings and opinion polls on people's favourite Shōwa era songs. It has been said that the popularity of 1980s female idols with young people is partly attributable to the appearance of Kyoko Koizumi and Hiroko Yakushimaru in Amachan (2013). There have been Shōwa retro music festivals, and Shōwa retro tribute bands to Showa era musicians such as the Candies. The "Shōwa Retrophone" (Japanese: 昭和レトロフォン) resembles a gramophone, and plays Shōwa era music by Shizuko Kasagi, which appeared on television in Boogie Woogie (2023). There are kayōkyoku pubs. Nippon Crown has a Shōwa retro Youtube channel.

The song "Omoide No Kujūkurihama" (1991) by Mi-Ke is a homage to group sounds with lyrics that list twelve songs released from 1966 to 1968. Hitomi Shimatani's 2002 cover version of the Village Singers' song "Amairo No Kami No Otome" (1968) sold more copies than the original. In 2005, there was said to be a group sounds revival. 1960s GS films were released on DVD in 2007, and there were group sounds festivals that summer. GS Wonderland (2008) is a group sounds nostalgia film.

== Print ==
As of 2004, Shōwa retro calendars were popular.

=== Manga ===
It has been said that the publication of Sunset on Third Street in 1974 caused a period of increased nostalgia.

=== Magazines and newspapers ===
Shūkan Shōwa Taimuzu (2007) and Shūkan Shōwa (Japanese: 週刊昭和) (2008) are Shōwa nostalgia magazines. The nostalgia magazines Shōwa 40 nen Otoko (2009), Shōwa 45 nen Onna (2021) and Shōwa 50 nen Otoko (2019) are aimed at people born in 1965, 1970 and 1975.

The Mainichi Shimbun published Showa Mainichi (Japanese: 昭和毎日) (2008) and NewsBox (Japanese: ニュースボックス) (2009).

== Video games ==
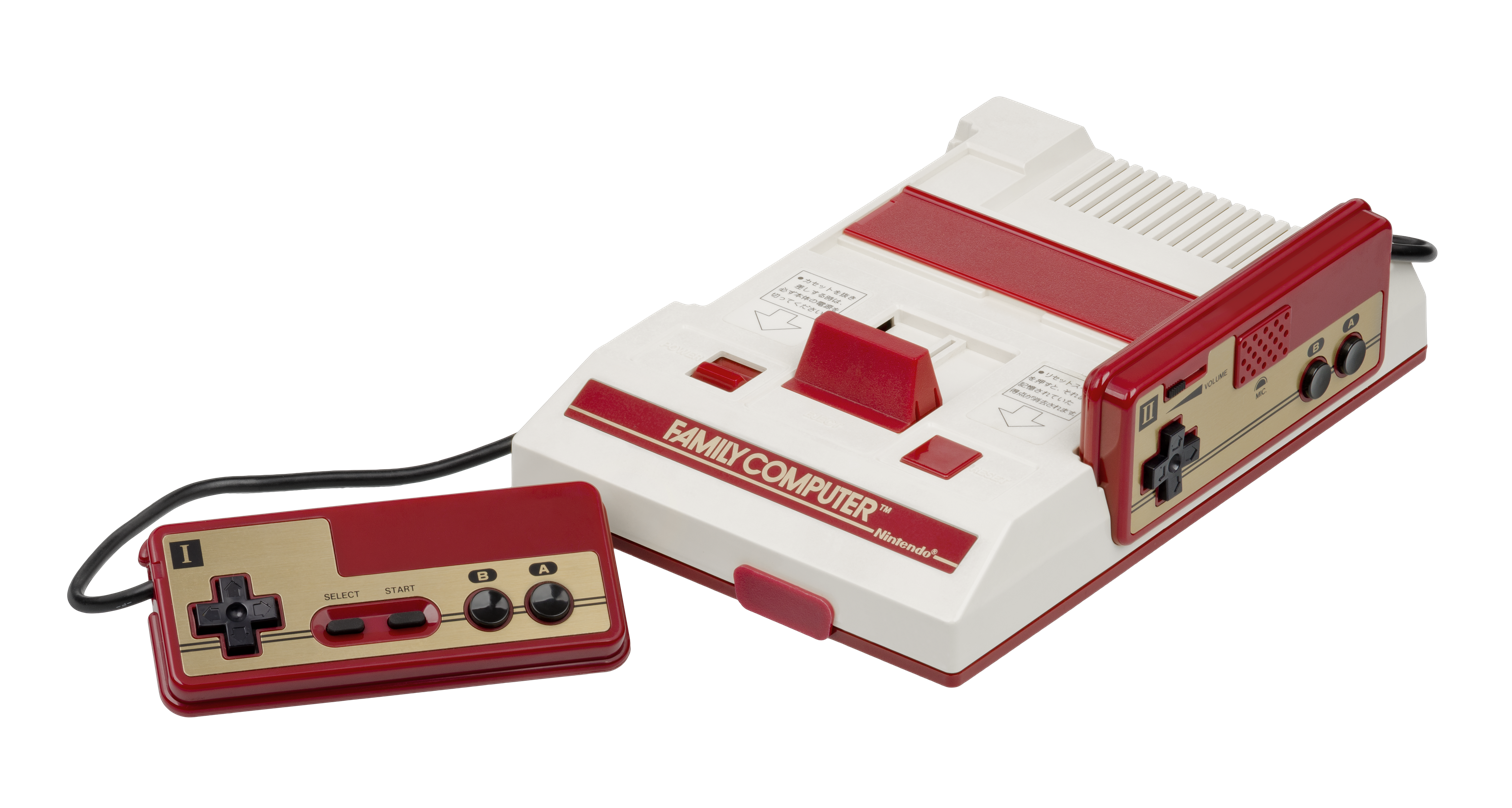
Famicom main unit with hardwired controllers

Shōwa retro includes handheld versions of arcade games such as Space Invaders (1978), Pac-Man (1980) and Galaga (1981), the revived popularity of Famicom, and the release of new consoles capable of playing Famicom games.

== Toys ==
Adults are expressing Shōwa nostalgia by collecting capsule toys. There is nostalgia for Shōwa era toys, and the Shibamata toy museum (Japanese: 柴又のおもちゃ博物館) in Shibamata has a collection of them. As of 1988, there were displays of celluloid dolls (Japanese: セルロイド人形) that had been popular before 1956. The Rubik's Cube was popular in 2024, and there was a trend for new versions of Shōwa and Heisei era toys. Revivals include Butaminton.

== Miniatures ==
There are Shōwa retro miniatures, such as the Shōwa series (Japanese: ザ・昭和シリーズ) of miniature replicas of Shōwa era electrical appliances.

== Sport ==
The Oriental Witches volleyball team were featured in NHK Shōwa nostalgia television programmes in the 1990s.

== Exhibitions and amusement parks ==
Expo '70 logo

There is nostalgia for Expo '70. There are Shōwa retro theme parks. Showa no Machi is a Shōwa retro town.

== Fashion ==
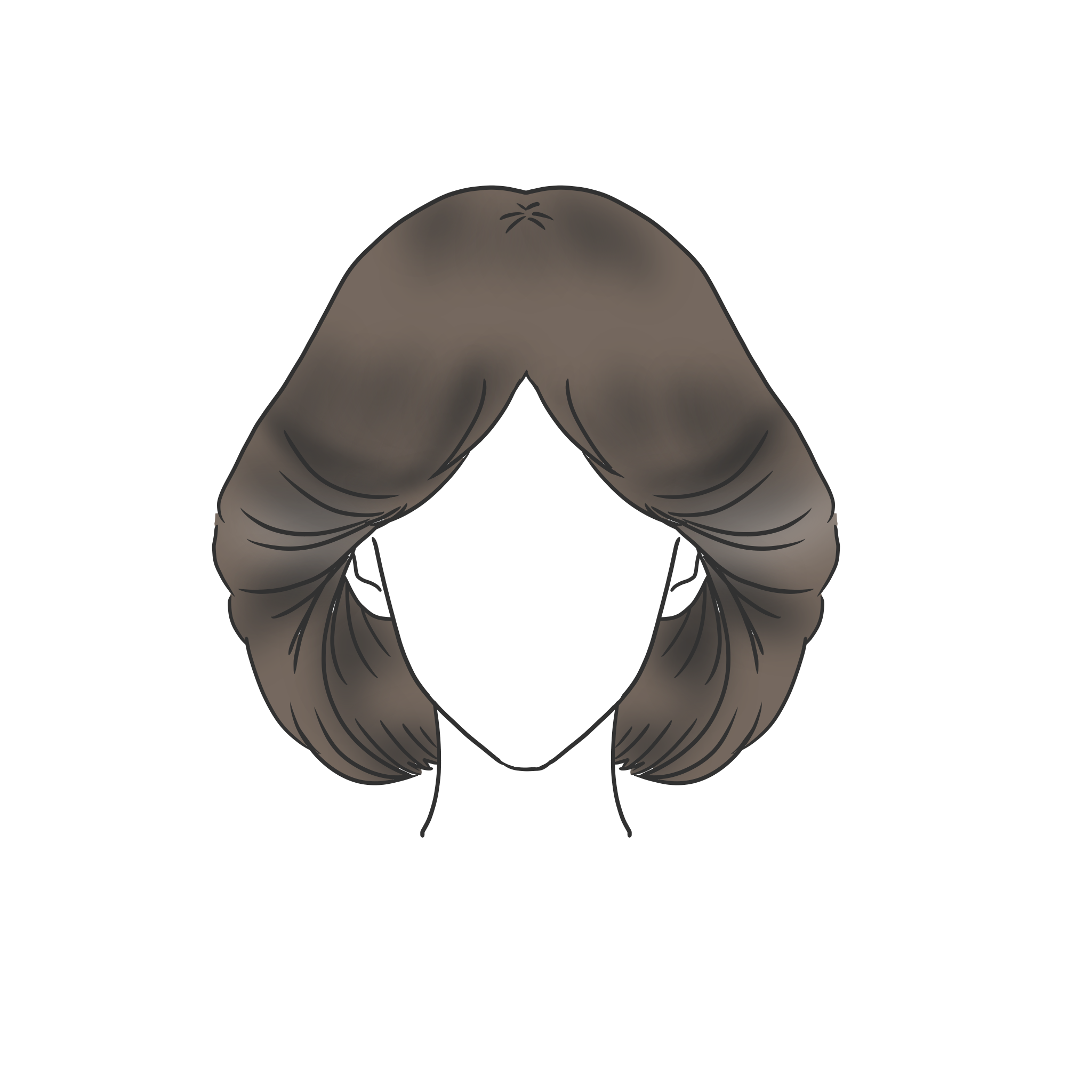
Drawing of the Seiko-chan cut

Shōwa retro includes the revival of Shōwa era fashions such as the taiyozoku clothing style. There are Shōwa retro sneakers, and there are shops for clothing produced in the Shōwa era. The wearing of shoulder pads is a manifestation of nostalgia for the bubble era of the 1980s. Akina Nakamori's Shōwa era makeup is being imitated by teenage girls in China. Her Shōwa era hairstyle is also imitated and popular. There is nostalgia for the Seiko-chan cut and there are Shōwa retro barber shops. There is a revival of Shōwa era hairstyles.

== Food and drink ==
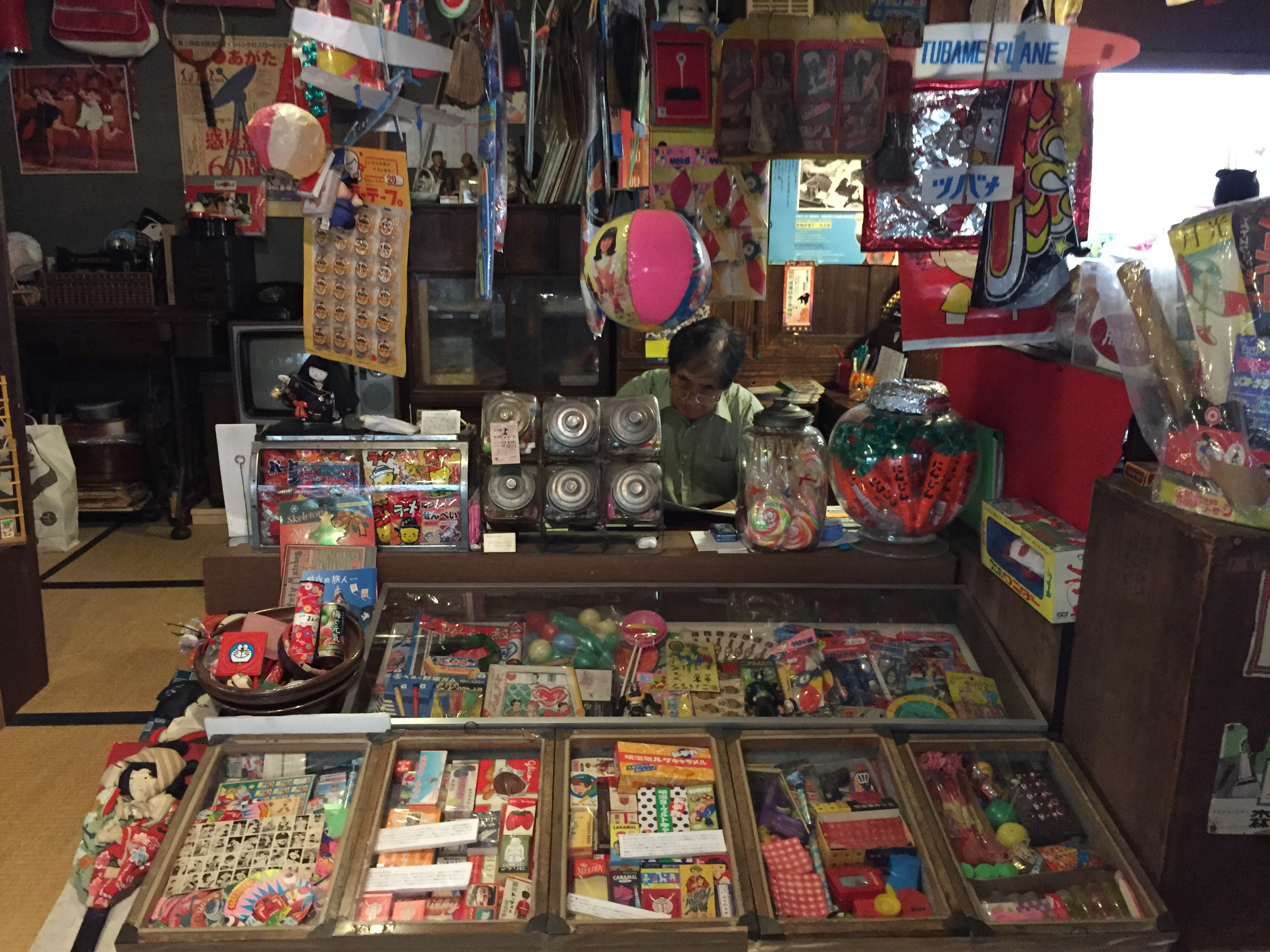
Recreation of a dagashi shop at the Shōwa Retro Packaging Museum, Ōme

Manifestations of Shōwa retro include the revival of kissaten and tableware with floral patterns, and the consumption of dagashi and ice cream soda (クリームソーダ). McDonald's Japan produced the "Kissa Mac" range of food in 2023.

== Shopping ==
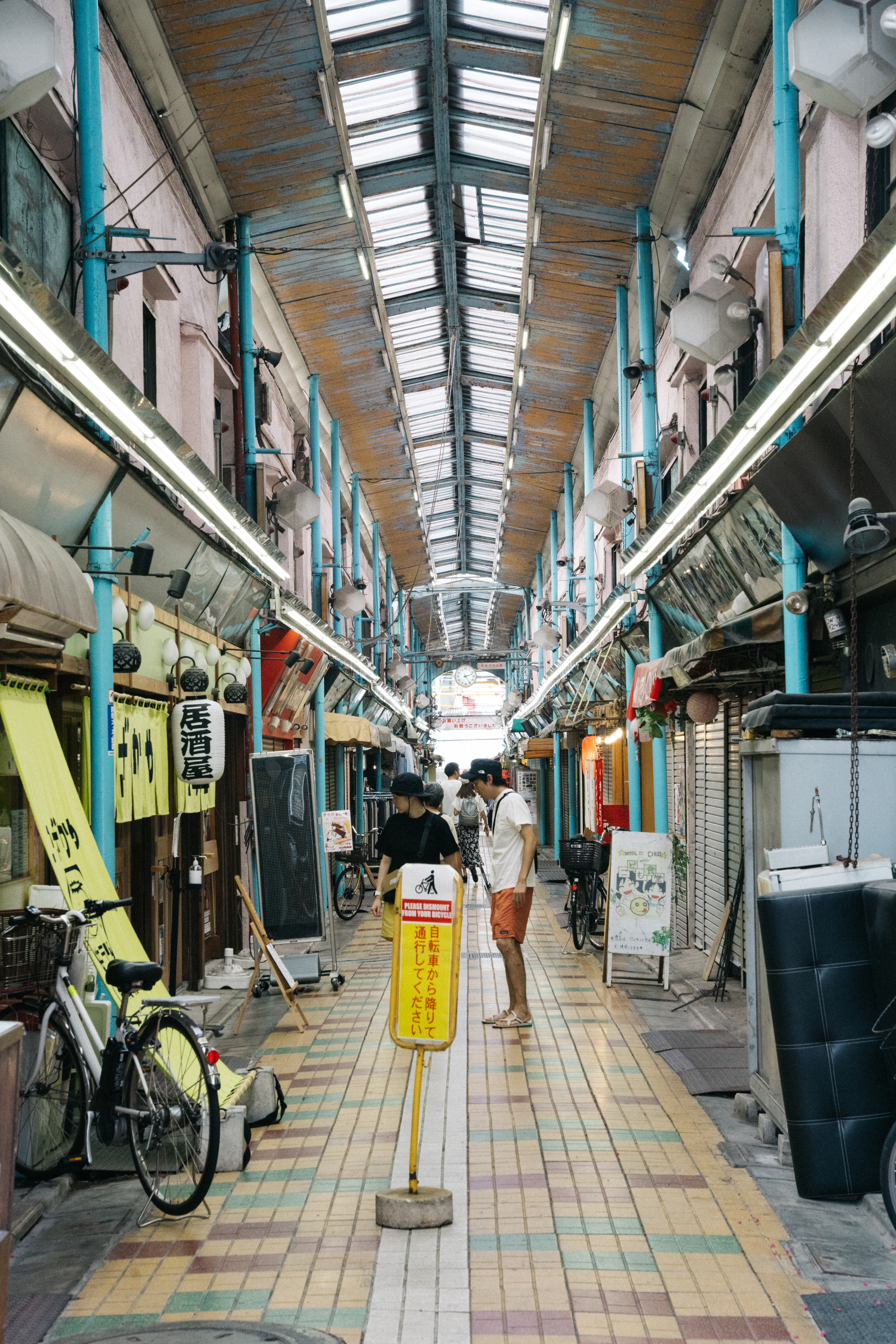
Tateishi Nakamise Shotengai, in Tateishi, Tokyo, a Shōwa retro shōtengai

There are Shōwa retro shōtengai (shopping streets). There is a recreation of a 1960s shōtengai in the Seibu-en amusement park. The Sagamihara Vending Machine Park consists of retro vending machines from the Shōwa era.

== Hotels ==
There are Shōwa retro hotels.

== Architecture ==
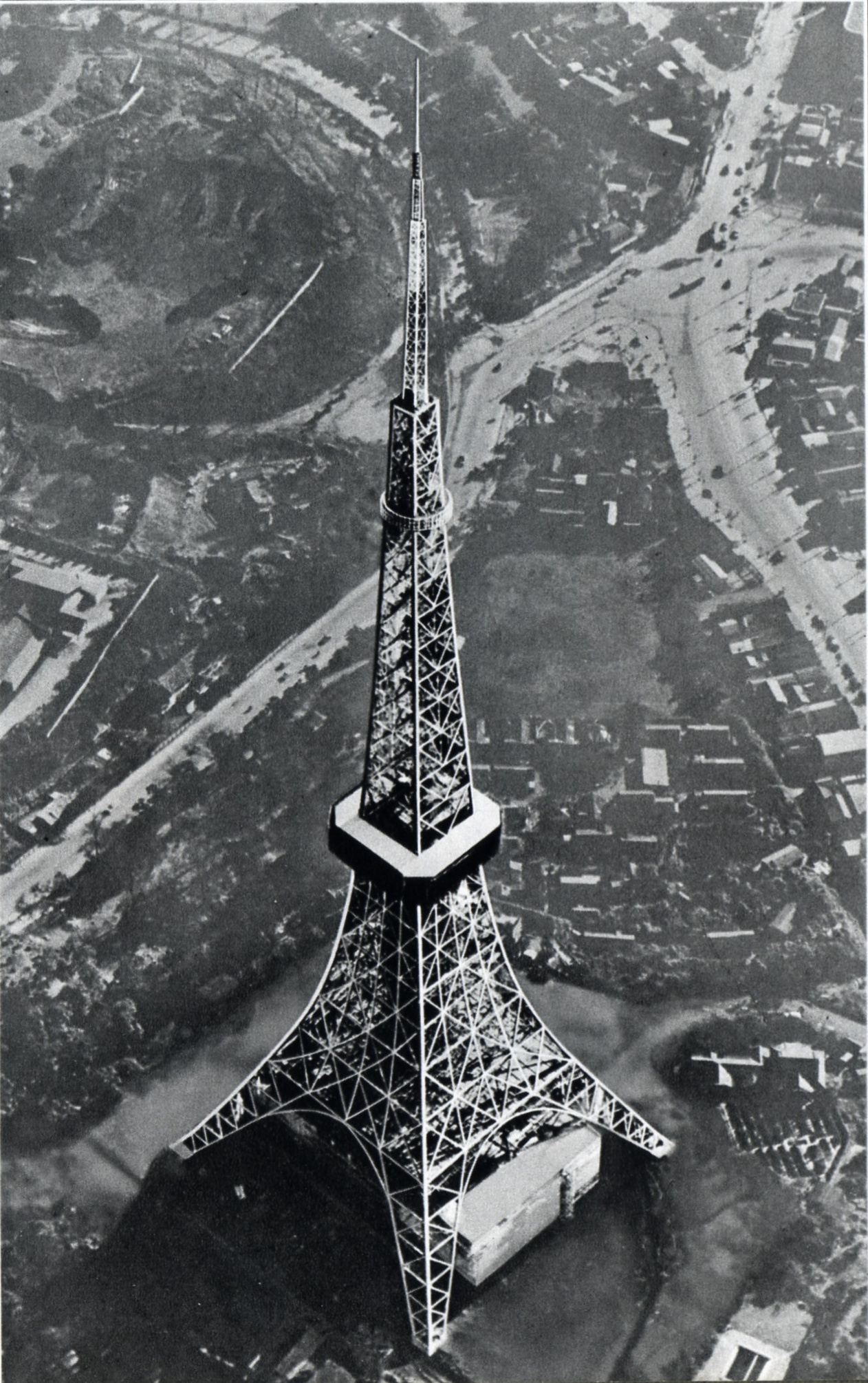
Tokyo Tower in 1961

There is nostalgia for the Tokyo Tower. There are Shōwa era architecture enthusiasts.

== Technology ==
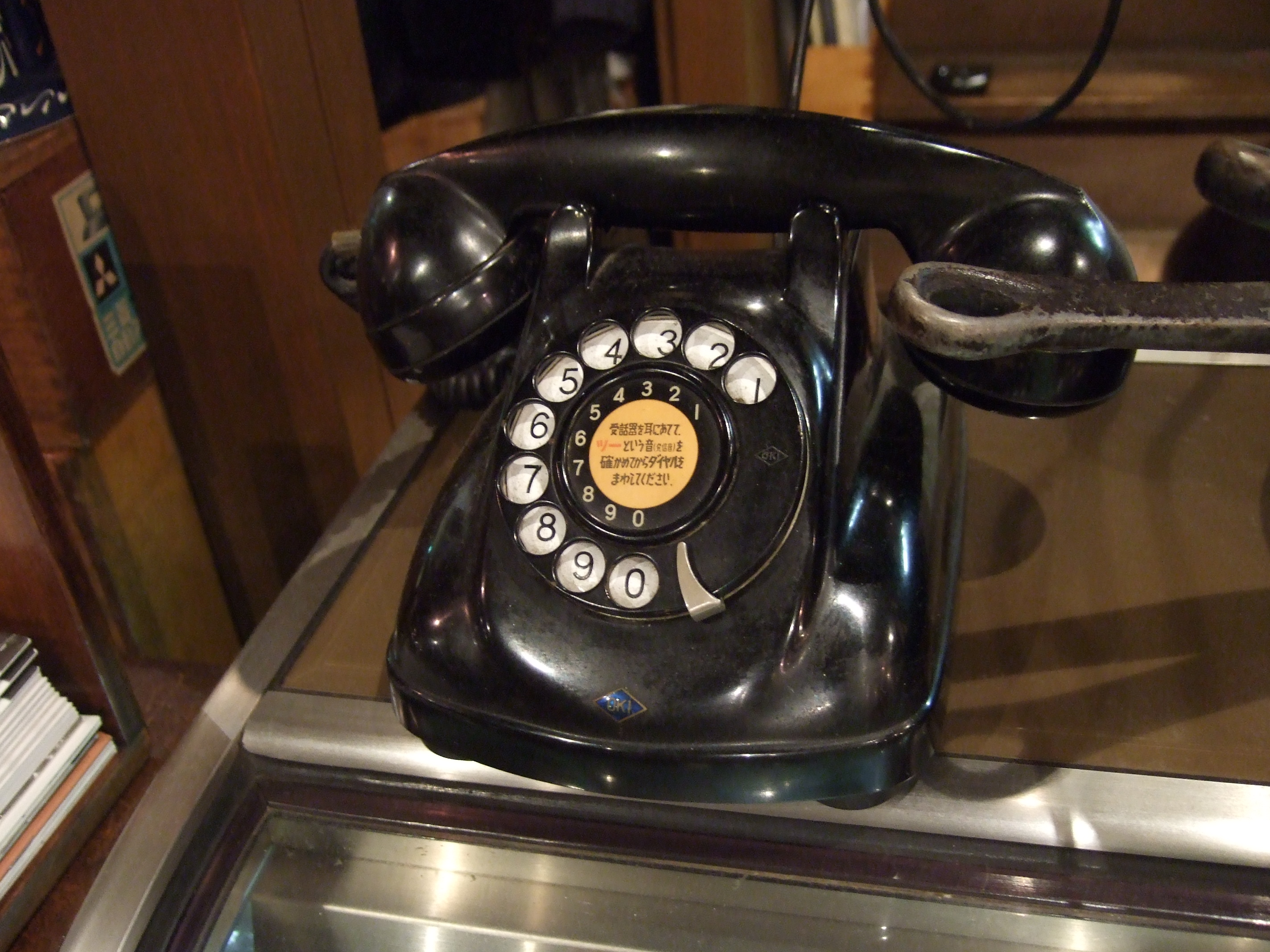
Type 4 telephone

Shōwa retro includes the revived popularity of rotary telephones.

=== Analogue technology ===
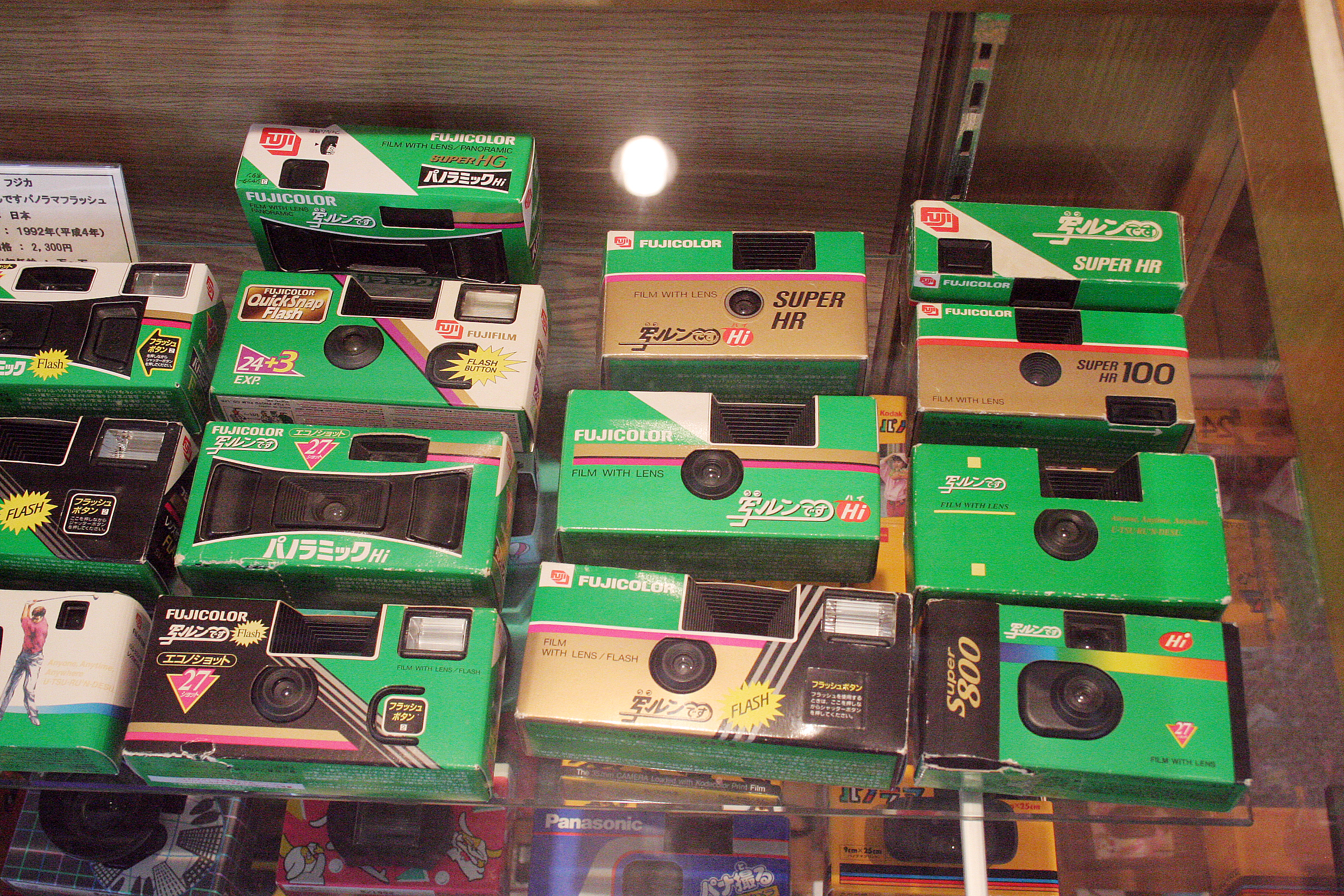
Fujicolor Utsurundesu cameras

Manifestations of Shōwa retro include the revival of disposable cameras, such as the Fujicolor Utsurundesu (写ルンです; 1986), and cassette tapes, and vinyl records, and jukeboxes. The VHS Cam app, which imitates 1980s VHS footage, was popular in 2019.

== Cars ==
The Mitsuoka M55 is a Shōwa retro car from Mitsuoka. There are collectors of Shōwa era cars.

== Second-hand goods ==
As of 2023, the value of some second-hand Shōwa retro goods produced in the Shōwa era had doubled. Shōwa era retro goods have become popular as Christmas gifts.

== Museums ==
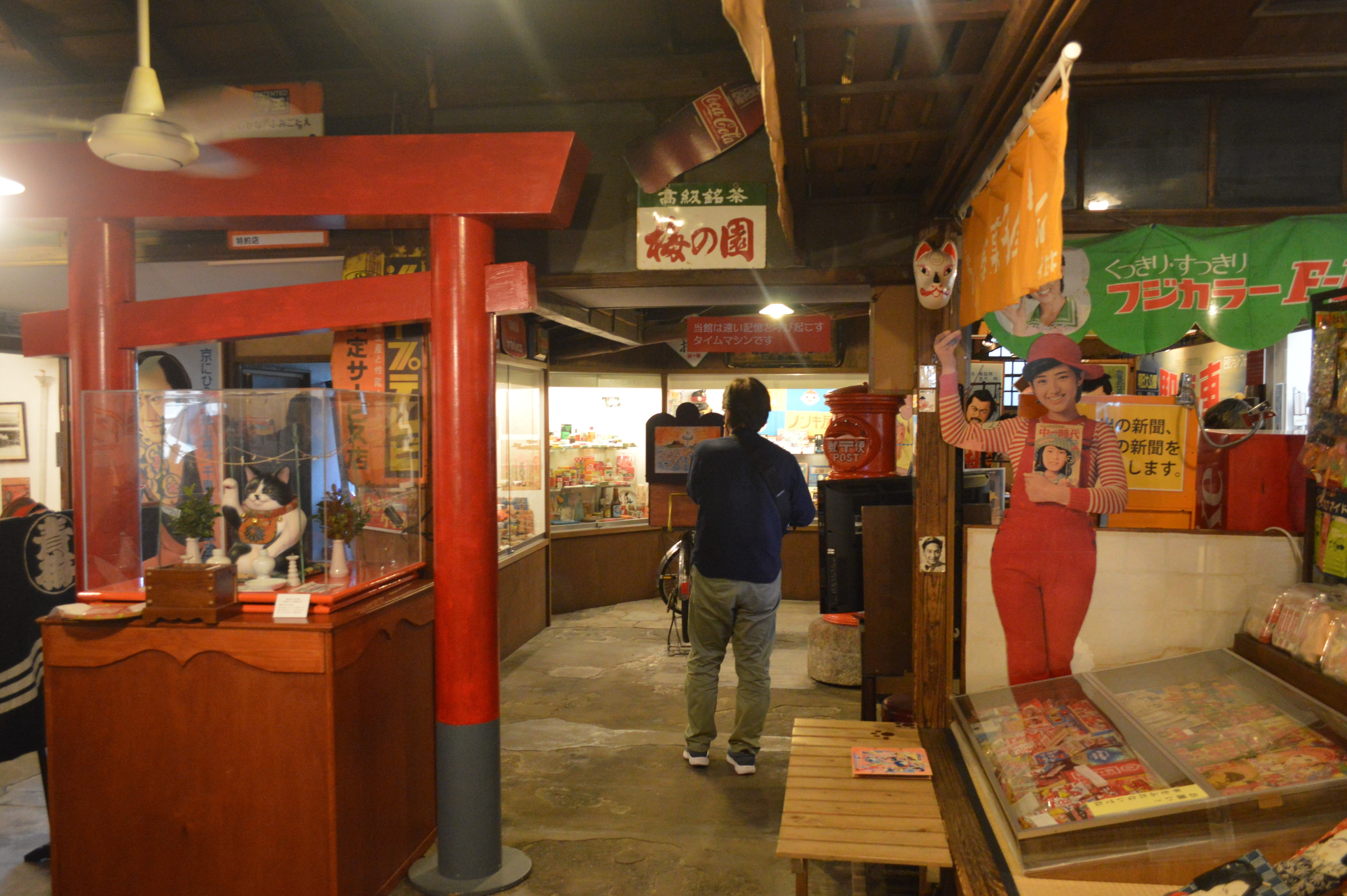
Displays at the Shōwa Retro Packaging Museum, Ōme

There is a Shōwa Retro Packaging Museum in Ōme, Tokyo. There are Shōwa retro exhibits at the Retrospace-zaka Kaikan in Nishi-ku, Sapporo and at the Shōwa Era Lifestyle Museum in Kitanagoya. The Odaiba Retro Museum (お台場レトロミュージアム) is a Shōwa retro museum.

== Politics ==
As of 2017, there was nostalgia for former prime minister Kakuei Tanaka.

== Masks ==
As of 2011, Shōwa retro included the revival of kamado-gami masks.

== See also ==
- Taishō Roman
