= Bible II =

1994 compilation album by Seiko Matsuda

Studio album by Seiko Matsuda
- Released: December 1, 1994
- Genre: J-pop
- Length: 135:14
- Label: Sony Music Entertainment Japan

Seiko Matsuda chronology
Bible (1991)	Bible II (1994)	Bible III (1996)

Bible II is the twelfth compilation album by Japanese singer Seiko Matsuda. The songs on the album were selected by Seiko herself.

== Chart performance ==
Bible II debuted at number fourteen at the Oricon Album Weekly Chart.

== Track listing ==
CD – disc one
No.	Title	Lyrics	Music	Arrangement	Length
1.	"Aoi Sangoshou (「青い珊瑚礁」)"	Yoshiko Miura	Yuichiro Oda	Masaaki Omura	3:42
2.	"Akai Sweet Pea (「赤いスイートピー」)"	Takashi Matsumoto	Yumi Matsutoya	Masataka Matsutoya	3:40
3.	"Nagisa no Balcony (「渚のバルコニー」)"	Takashi Matsumoto	Yumi Matsutoya	Masataka Matsutoya	3:44
4.	"Komugiiro no Mermaid (「小麦色のマーメイド」)"	Takashi Matsumoto	Yumi Matsutoya	Masataka Matsutoya	3:37
5.	"Himitsu no Hanazono (「秘密の花園」)"	Takashi Matsumoto	Yumi Matsutoya	Masataka Matsutoya	3:32
6.	"Tengoku no Kiss (「天国のキッス」)"	Takashi Matsumoto	Haruomi Hosono	Haruomi Hosono	3:59
7.	"Glass no Ringo (「ガラスの林檎」)"	Takashi Matsumoto	Haruomi Hosono	Haruomi Hosono	3:58
8.	"Rock'n Rouge"	Takashi Matsumoto	Yumi Matsutoya	Masataka Matsutoya	4:17
9.	"Jikan no Kuni no Alice (「時間の国のアリス」)"	Takashi Matsumoto	Yumi Matsutoya	Masaaki Omura	4:44
10.	"Tenshi no Wink (「天使のウィンク」)"	Amii Ozaki	Ami Ozaki	Masaaki Omura	4:02
11.	"Tabidachi wa Freesia (「旅立ちはフリージア」)"	Yukihide Takekawa	Yukihide Takekawa	Akira Inoue	4:52
12.	"Kitto, Mata Aeru (「きっと、また逢える」)"	Seiko Matsuda	Seiko Matsuda, Ryo Ogura	Yuji Toriyama	4:48
13.	"Anata no Subete ni Naritai (「あなたのすべてになりたい」)"	Seiko Matsuda	Seiko Matsuda, Ryo Ogura	Yuji Toriyama	4:16
14.	"Taisetsu na Anata (「大切なあなた」)"	Seiko Matsuda	Seiko Matsuda, Ryo Ogura	Yuji Toriyama	4:24
15.	"Mou Ichido, Hajime kara (「もう一度、初めから」)"	Seiko Matsuda	Seiko Matsuda, Ryo Ogura	Yuji Toriyama	4:55

CD – disc two
No.	Title	Lyrics	Music	Arrangement	Length
1.	"Miami Gozen Goji (「マイアミ午前5時」)"	Takashi Matsumoto	Takao Kisugi	Masaaki Omura	4:57
2.	"Seifuku (「制服」)"	Takashi Matsumoto	Yumi Matsutoya	Masataka Matsutoya	3:36
3.	"Bon Voyage (「ボン・ボヤージュ」)"	Takashi Matsumoto	Yumi Matsutoya	Masataka Matsutoya	4:34
4.	"Jikan Ryokou (「時間旅行」)"	Takashi Matsumoto	Seiko	Akira Inoue	4:28
5.	"Daite (「抱いて」)"	Takashi Matsumoto	David Foster	Yuji Toriyama	4:39
6.	"Sweet Memories"	Takashi Matsumoto	Masaaki Omura	Yuji Toriyama	4:29
7.	"Ruriiro no Chikyu (「瑠璃色の地球」)"	Takashi Matsumoto	Natsumi Hirai		4:26
8.	"Time for Love"	Seiko Matsuda	Seiko Matsuda, Ryo Ogura	Yuji Toriyama	4:26
9.	"Baby Baby"	Seiko Matsuda	Seiko Matsuda, Ryo Ogura	Yuji Toriyama	4:01
10.	"I Want You So Bad!"	Seiko Matsuda	Seiko Matsuda, Ryo Ogura	Yuji Toriyama	4:09
11.	"Hot Thing"	Seiko Matsuda	Seiko Matsuda, Ryo Ogura	Yuji Toriyama	4:20
12.	"Dear Mom & Dad"	Seiko Matsuda	Seiko Matsuda, Ryo Ogura	Yuji Toriyama	5:22
13.	"Umibe no Cafe Terrace (「海辺のカフェテラス」)"	Seiko Matsuda	Seiko Matsuda, Ryo Ogura	Yuji Toriyama	3:47
14.	"Back for More"	Seiko Matsuda	Seiko Matsuda, Ryo Ogura	Yuji Toriyama	5:01
15.	"Watashi ni Dekiru Subete no Koto (「わたしにできるすべてのこと」)"	Seiko Matsuda	Seiko Matsuda, Ryo Ogura	Yuji Toriyama	5:20
16.	"It's Style"	Seiko Matsuda	Seiko Matsuda, Ryo Ogura	Yuji Toriyama	4:26
