= Seiko-chan cut =

Hairstyle popular in 1980s Japan

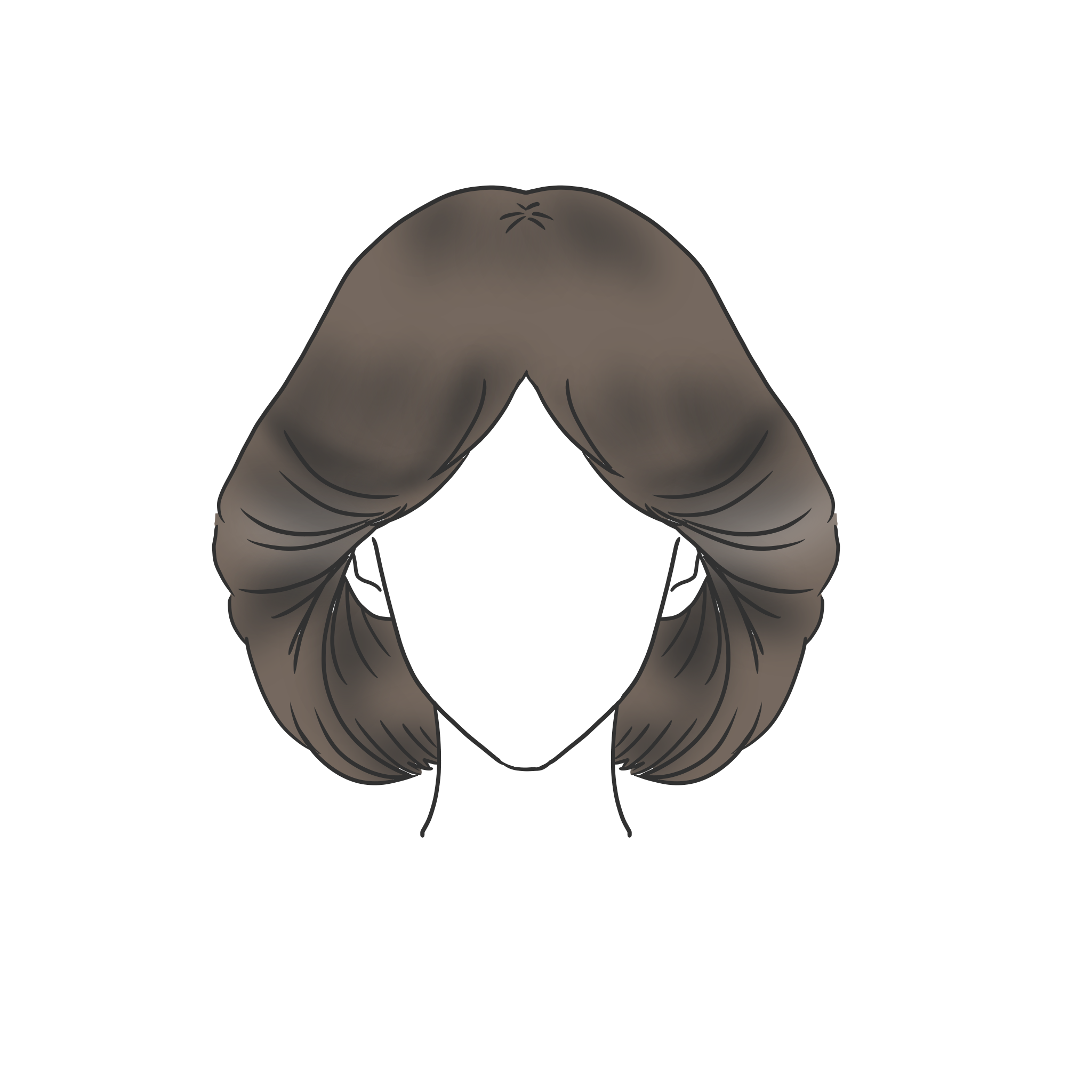
Illustration of the Seiko-chan cut

Seiko-chan cut (聖子ちゃんカット) is a popular name for a kind of feathered hairstyle, named after and popularized by Japanese pop singer and idol Seiko Matsuda, although the hairstyle itself predated Matsuda's debut. The hairstyle was popular among young Japanese women in the 80s. It is a layered haircut that hides the eyebrows with bangs, and the sides are blown outwards and the back is curled inwards.

== History ==
The feathered hairstyle became internationally popular with Farrah Fawcett, whose hairstyle was referred as the "Farrah-do", "Farrah-flip", or simply "Farrah hair". Some Japanese singers and idols in the late 1970s such as Sakiko Ito had similar hairstyles to the Seiko-chan cut.

Seiko Matsuda wore this hairstyle even before her debut; she is seen with the hairstyle in the drama Odaiji ni and on the cover of the first single "Hadashi no Kisetsu". The hairstyle was established with the release of the second single "Aoi Sangoshou" and became Matsuda's trademark. It is thought that Matsuda was imitating Olivia Newton-John who at the time had feathered hair.

Matsuda kept this hairstyle until the end of 1981. With the release of her single "Red Sweet Pea" in January of the following year, Matsuda bore shorter hair with a perm, which surprised fans and the public in Japan. According to Matsuda, she wanted to cut her hair, which had a lot of volume since the time of the single "Kaze Tachinu".

== Trend in Japan ==
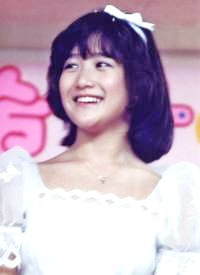
Idol Yukiko Okada with the Seiko-chan cut

When Matsuda debuted in 1980, she became popular among ordinary girls and high school students. From this time on, the names "Seiko cut" and "Seiko-chan cut" were established.

Popular kayōkyoku idols such as Kyoko Koizumi (before cutting it into a short pixie in 1983), Iyo Matsumoto, Chiemi Hori and Yu Hayami debuted with the Seiko-chan cut in 1982. Akina Nakamori made her debut with a longer Seiko-chan cut before changing it into a ponytail.

Later in 1984, idols Momoko Kikuchi and Yukiko Okada, the latter a junior of Matsuda, debuted with the Seiko-chan cut. Other idols who debuted with the Seiko-chan cut include Miho Nakayama, Yui Asaka, Hiroko Moriguchi, and Tomomi Nishimura. The trend began to wane in the late 1980s, but pianists such as Ikuyo Nakamichi kept this style until the 1990s.

In the 2013 asadora Amachan, Haruko Amano (Kyoko Koizumi), who played the youth, appeared with a Seiko-chan cut as an aspect of the time. In 2016, when Fumi Nikaido appeared in Gochi 17, Kyary Pamyu Pamyu also showed this hairstyle on her Instagram.
