= Kaze wa Akiiro / Eighteen =

Single by Seiko Matsuda

from the album North Wind
- Language: Japanese
- English title: The Wind is Autumn-Colored
- A-side: "Eighteen" (double A side)
- Released: October 1, 1980
- Genre: J-pop; kayōkyoku
- Length: 4:09
- Label: CBS/Sony
- Composer: Yuichiro Oda
- Lyricist: Yoshiko Miura

Seiko Matsuda singles chronology
"Aoi Sangoshou"	"Kaze wa Akiiro / Eighteen"	"Cherry Blossom"

Audio videos
- "Kaze wa Akiiro" on YouTube
- "Eighteen" on YouTube

"Kaze wa Akiiro" (Japanese: 風は秋色; lit. 'The Wind is Autumn-Colored') and "Eighteen" are two songs recorded by Japanese idol singer Seiko Matsuda, released together as a double A-side and her third single on October 1, 1980. The single peaked at number 1 on the Oricon Weekly Singles Chart, sold approximately 797,000 copies, and marked the beginning of a streak of 24 consecutive number one singles for Matsuda.

== Background ==
"Kaze wa Akiiro" was written and composed by Yoshiko Miura and Yuichiro Oda respectively, both of whom had also written and composed Matsuda's two previous singles. The song's arrangement was done by Kazuo Shinoda, who also arranged Matsuda's debut single, "Hadashi no Kisetsu".

"Eighteen" was written by Miura, and composed by Masaaki Hirao.

== Release and reception ==
"Kaze wa Akiiro / Eighteen" was released as a double A-side single on October 1, 1980. It peaked at number 1 on the Oricon Weekly Singles chart, and charted for 20 weeks. It sold approximately 797,000 copies. "Kaze wa Akiiro / Eighteen" was the first in a streak of 24 number one singles for Matsuda, ended by the release of "Tabidachi wa Freesia" in 1988.

== Charts ==
Chart (1980)	Peak position
Japan (Oricon)	1

== See also ==
- 1980 in Japanese music
