= Seiko Matsuda =

Japanese pop singer and actress (born 1962)

- 松田 聖子
- Born: Noriko Kamachi (蒲池 法子); 10 March 1962 (age 64); Kurume, Fukuoka, Japan
- Occupations: Singer; songwriter; actress; businesswoman
- Spouses: Masaki Kanda (m. 1985; div. 1997) Hiroyuki Hatano (m. 1998; div. 2000) Hiromasa Kawana (m. 2012)
- Children: Sayaka Kanda (1986–2021)
- Musical career
- Genres: Pop; kayōkyoku; jazz
- Works: Albums; singles
- Years active: 1980–present
- Labels: CBS/Sony; Mercury; A&M; EMI/Universal
- Website: www.seikomatsuda.co.jp

YouTube information
- Channel: 松田聖子オフィシャルYouTubeチャンネル
- Years active: 2020–present
- Subscribers: 208 thousand
- Views: 138.4 million
- Last updated: 31 March 2026

Noriko Kamachi (蒲池 法子, Kamachi Noriko; born 10 March 1962), known professionally as Seiko Matsuda (松田 聖子, Matsuda Seiko), is a Japanese singer-songwriter, known for being one of the most popular Japanese idols of the 1980s. Since then, she has continued to release new singles and albums, put on annual summer concert tours, and perform in winter dinner shows. She makes frequent appearances in high-profile TV commercials and movies, and on radio. Her alma mater is Chuo University.

Due to her popularity in the 1980s and her long career, she has been dubbed the "Eternal Idol" by the Japanese media. In January 2011, the Japanese music television program Music Station listed her as the 2nd best-selling idol of all time in Japan, with 29,510,000 records sold. She placed behind pop group SMAP and ahead of Akina Nakamori, her biggest rival of the 1980s.

Matsuda once held the record of 25 number-one hits for musicians from 1983 to 2000 (broken by B'z) and for female solo artists (broken by Ayumi Hamasaki in 2010). Matsuda was a performer on the finale of Kouhaku (Red White Music Battle) in 2014, 2015 and 2025, the prestigious NHK New Year's Eve Music show on which she has performed 25 times, as of 2025.

== Early life and family ==
Noriko Kamachi was born on 10 March 1962, in Chikuhō, Mizuma, Fukuoka Prefecture (present-day Arakimachi, Kurume, Fukuoka Prefecture), the eldest daughter of her parents. Her father was a government official at the Ministry of Health and Welfare and her mother was from a family of former village heads from Yame. She is a descendant of Kamachi Akimori of the Kamachi clan, the lords of Yanagawa Castle, who were the most powerful feudal lords in Chikugo Province in the service of the Ōtomo clan during the Sengoku period.

== Career ==
=== 1978–1980 ===
In 1978, Seiko attended the Miss Seventeen contest held by a popular teenage magazine, where she won the top prize. Following this win, she was spotted and scouted by CBS Sony Producer Muneo Wakamatsu. The sixteen-year-old Noriko Kamachi had to choose between the stage names Seiko Arata or Seiko Matsuda, choosing the latter.

In 1979, she started to rise in popularity as a magazine teen idol, and, in the same year, debuted as an actress in all 26 episodes of the television series Odaijini, broadcast by Nippon TV.

In January 1980, Seiko made her debut as a radio personality, appearing weekly for the entire run of the radio program "The Punch Punch Punch," by Nippon Radio.

In April 1980, she made her musical debut with the song "Hadashi no Kisetsu" (lit. "Barefoot Season"). The song was featured in a television commercial for Shiseido's Ekubo, which was broadcast two months before the song's release, in February. During the commercial broadcast, it was assumed that the actress in the commercial was singing the song. Originally, Seiko was supposed to be a commercial actress; however she had a poor audition and was replaced by Yukiko Yamada. The single was an immediate hit with listeners, debuting at No. 12 on the Oricon Weekly charts and selling over 280,000 copies.

In July 1980, Seiko released her second single "Aoi Sangoshou," which served as the musical backing for Glico's ice cream product Yolel. It was her first single to debut in the Top 3 on the Oricon Weekly Charts and has since sold over 600,000 copies. The single was nominated at the 22nd Japan Record Awards in the category of New Artist Award and was rewarded with the special award in the 11th Japan Music Awards along with Toshihiko Tahara. On the yearly Oricon rankings, the singled ranked 15th. In September 1980, Seiko launched her first concert, entitled "First Kiss."

With the popularity of "Aoi Sangoshou," female fans all over the country were inspired by her haircut, which generated great demand at hair salons and became ubiquitous as the Seiko-chan cut. The haircut inspired future acting idols such as Akina Nakamori and Minako Honda.

In August 1980, Seiko released her first studio album Squall, which included the two previous singles and eight newly recorded songs. The single debuted at No. 2 on the Oricon Weekly charts.

In October 1980, Seiko released her third single "Kaze wa Akiiro" (lit. "The Wind is Autumn-Colored"). It became her third television commercial song to be associated with Shiseido, this time for the product Ekubo: Milky Fresh. The song became her first single to debut at number one on the Oricon Weekly Charts and sold approximately 797,000 copies. On the 1980 yearly Oricon rankings, the single ranked 14th and in the 1981 yearly Oricon rankings, it remained in 65th place. The single became one of the first of her 24 consecutive number-one hits in Japan.

In December 1980, she released her second studio album, North Wind, four months after the previous album's release. The album included the single "Kaze wa Akiiro" along with its B-side track, "Eighteen," and eight newly recorded songs. The album debuted at number one on the Oricon Weekly charts.

At the end of 1980, Seiko made her first appearance on the 21st edition of the New Year's Eve program Kohaku.

=== 1981–1982 ===
In January 1981, she released her fourth single "Cherry Blossom". Unlike the previous singles, it did not receive much promotion. Despite that, it charted at No.1 on the Oricon Weekly Charts and sold approximately 676,000 copies. On the yearly Oricon rankings, the single ranked 9th. After the release, Seiko stated in an interview that it was one of her favorite songs of that time.

In April 1981, Matsuda released her fifth single "Natsu no Tobira". It became her fourth television commercial song to be associated with Shiseido, and the second one to be used in connection with Ekubo's Milky Fresh. The single charted at number one on the Oricon Weekly Charts and sold over 568,000 copies. On the yearly Oricon rankings, the single ranked 14th. Thee same month, she launched her first nationwide series of concerts: 81 Seiko Big Concert in Tokyo. Soon after, she launched another concert tour Nice Summer Seiko, which lasted between July and September.

In May 1981, she released her third studio album Silhouette, which included two previously released singles and 8 newly recorded songs. The album debuted in 2nd place on the Oricon Weekly charts.

In July, she released her sixth single "Shiroi Parasol". The single charted in 1st place on the Oricon Weekly Charts and sold over 488,000 copies. On the yearly Oricon rankings, the single ranked in 23rd place. In August, she received her first major role as an actresses in Nogiku no Hana, as well as performing its theme song, "Hana Hitoiro – Nogiku No Sasayaki". The song was released as the B-side of the single "Shiroi Parasol".

Her seventh single, "Kaze Tachinu", was released in October 1981. During the recording, Matsuda's vocals had suffered and occasionally she had cried on television performances, not being able to sing properly. The single was written by Eichi Ohtaki, a well-known musician at that time. It became her second television commercial song for the Glico's Sweet Pocky. The single charted at 1st place on the Oricon Weekly Charts and sold over 519,000 copies. On the yearly Oricon rankings, the single ranked in 34th place. It received the Golden Idol Award at the 23rd Japan Record Awards and the Radio Music Award at the 12th Japan Music Awards.

Three weeks after the single was released, her fourth studio album, also titled Kaze Tachinu, was released. It included "Kaze Tachinu", "Shiroi Parasol" and eight newly recorded songs. The album debuted at number one on the Oricon Weekly charts. On the yearly Oricon rankings, the album ranked 34th.

In November 1981, the recording studio released her first compilation album entitled Seiko Fragrance. It included singles, a B-side track and selected tracks from the previously released studio albums. The album debuted at 3rd place on the Oricon Weekly charts.

At the end of 1981, she made her second appearance on Kohaku.

In January 1982, she released her eighth single, "Akai Sweet Pea". At this time, Seiko changed her visual appearance by cutting her hair very short and had to find a new vocal technique to continue singing. The song was written by Yumi Matsutoya, under her pen-name Karuho Kureta. The single charted at No.1 on the Oricon Weekly Charts and sold over 500,000 copies. On the yearly Oricon rankings, the single ranked 12th. The song has become one of the most iconic songs of hers.

In April, she released her ninth single "Nagisa no Balcony". The production team was the same as for her previous single. The single charted in 1st place on the Oricon Weekly Charts and sold over 514,000 copies. On the yearly Oricon rankings, the single ranked in 11th place. The song has become one her signature songs.

Between April and May Seiko launched a concert tour entitled Fantastic Concert.

While on tour in May, Seiko released her fifth studio album Pineapple, which included "Akai Sweet Pea", "Nagisa no Balcony" along with its B-Side track, and 7 newly recorded songs. The album debuted in 1st place on the Oricon Weekly charts.

In June 1982, she released her first home-video release Fantastic Concert Lemon no Kisetsu. The footage included songs performed in the concerts which had been held between April and May of that year. The release failed to chart.

In July 1982, she released her tenth single "Komugiiro no Marmalade", the third consecutive single written by Yumi Matsutoya. The single charted in 1st place on the Oricon Weekly Charts and sold over 467,000 copies. On the yearly Oricon rankings, the single ranked 23rd. The single received the Golden Prize at the 24th Japan Record Awards.

In October 1982, she released her eleventh single "Nobara no Etude". The single charted at 1st place on the Oricon Weekly Charts and sold over 450,000 copies. On the yearly Oricon rankings in 1982, the singled ranked in 41st place and in the 1983 yearly rankings in 75th place. The single received the Grand Prix at the 11th FNS Music Festival and the radio music award at the 13th Japan Music Awards.

The sixth studio album, Candy, was released half a year after the previous album. The album included "Nobara no Etude" and nine newly recorded songs. The album debuted at 1st place on the Oricon Weekly charts. In December 1982, Seiko held her first concert in Nippon Budoukan entitled, Christmas Queen, and appeared on the New Year television program Kohaku for the third time.

=== 1983–1984 ===
In February 1983, Seiko released her twelfth single "Himitsu no Hanazono", the fourth to be written by Matsutoya. The production suffered because of an abrupt change in her production staff, which was originally to have been Kazuo Saitsu. The single charted at number one on the Oricon Weekly Charts and sold over 396,000 copies. On the yearly Oricon rankings in 1982, it ranked 22nd. In her television performances, Seiko wore a miniskirt which became a topic of discussion among viewers and fans. The single became the 10th consecutive number one single, breaking the record of nine consecutive number-ones by popular 1970s music duo Pink Lady.

On 28 March 1983, Seiko was attacked by a mentally ill person with a piece of metal in front of 6,000 fans during a performance held in Okinawa. Seiko collapsed after the assault, and was rushed to the hospital with her head bleeding. Doctors said preliminary X-rays did not show any brain damage. One week later, she had fully recovered and was able to perform again. However, the events left Seiko traumatized and she did not perform in Okinawa again until 2007.

In April, months after her previous single, she released her thirteenth single "Tengoku no Kiss". The single was written by Haruomi Hosono from the Yellow Magic Orchestra. The single served as the theme song for the movie "Primeria no Densetsu Tengoku no Kiss", in which Seiko played herself. The single charted at No.1 on the Oricon Weekly Charts and sold over 471,000 copies. On the yearly Oricon rankings in 1982, the singled ranked in 16th place.

During this year, Seiko started to write more of her own songs. In July, she released her 7th studio album, "Utopia". She wrote lyrics under the pen-name SEIKO for the first time for her song "Chiisana Love Song" (lit. "Little Love Song"), which she also produced. The album included two previously released singles, "Himitsu no Hanazono", and "Tengoku no Kiss", as well as eight newly written songs. The album debuted at No.1 on the Oricon Weekly charts. During that same month, Seiko launched a concert tour with the French title, "Un Deux Trois" and the movie "Primeria no Densetsu Tengoku no Kiss" was released, her second in a starring role.

In August 1983 she released her fourteenth single, "Glass no Ringo/Sweet Memories", written by Hosono. The B-side, "Sweet Memories" served as the musical backing to a television commercial for Suntory's canned beer. Due to the song's popularity, it received two releases titles, "Sweet Memories/Glass no Ringo". The release of the first edition of the single debuted at number one on the Oricon Weekly Charts and sold over 857,000 copies, as of 2023 the second best-selling single of her career. It received multiple awards: the Golden Grand Prix at the 1983 Anata ga Erabu Zen Nihon Kayou Ongakusai, the Golden Award at the 25th Japan Record Awards, Best Broadcast Music Award at the 14th Japan Music Awards and Best Performance Award at the 12th FNS Music Festival.

In October she released her fifteenth single "Hitomi wa Diamond/Aoi Photograph", the fifth written by Matsutoya. The B-side track served as the theme song for the television drama "Ao ga Chiru". The single debuted at number one on the Oricon Weekly Charts and sold over 568,000 copies. On the yearly Oricon rankings in 1983, the single ranked in 46th place and in the 1984 yearly Oricon rankings in 28th place.

In December Seiko released her 8th studio album "Canary", in which she wrote the lyrics for the mononymous track. It included one previously released single along with its B-side as well as eight newly written songs. The album debuted at number one on the Oricon Weekly charts. In the same month, she held her 2nd concert at the Budokan titled "Seiko Land" and appeared on Kohaku for the 4th time.

1984 was very busy, in that she launched four tours that year, which took up the whole year: "Jewels" between January and April, "Fantastic Fly" between April and June, "Magical Trump" between July and November and "Golden Juke" in December.

In February she released her sixteenth single "Rock'n Rouge", making it the sixth single written by Matsutoya. The song served as the television commercial for the cosmetic company product Lady 80BIO Lipstick by Kanebo. The single debuted at number 1 on the Oricon Weekly Charts and sold over 674,000 copies. On the yearly Oricon rankings, the single ranked 3rd. In that same month, she released her second home-video concert "Seikoland: Budoka Live 1983", which includes footage from the second concert she held at the Budokan in 1982. As with the previous release, it failed to chart.

Her song "Natsu No Jewelry" was the theme song of the Japanese version of The NeverEnding Story (film).

In May 1984 she released her seventeenth single "Jikan no Kuni no Alice", the seventh single to be written by Matsutoya. B-side track "Natsufuku no Eve" served as the theme song for the theatrical cinema movie of the same title, starring Seiko herself. The single debuted at number 1 on the Oricon Weekly Charts and sold over 477,000 copies. On the yearly Oricon rankings, the single ranked 15th.

In June she released her 9th studio album "Tinker Bell". Unlike the two previous released albums, it does not contain any track written by herself. The album includes singles Rock'n Rouge, Jikan no Kuni no Alice and 7 newly written songs. Until this release, the album always had 10 tracks in total, however in this case, only 9 were included due to her busy schedule. The album debuted at number 1 on the Oricon Weekly sales.

In August 1984 she released her eighteenth single "Pink no Mozart", written by Hosono. It became her second television commercial song to be associated with the Kakubo series of the products launched under the title "1984 Aki". The title itself has nothing to do with the famous composer and has never been explained to the public. The single charted at number one on the Oricon Weekly Charts and sold over 424,000 copies. On the yearly Oricon rankings, the singled ranked 17th.

In November 1984 she released her nineteenth single "Heart no Earring". It was her second single without any promotional ties. With this single, all of Seiko's singles since her debut have sold over 10 million copies. The single debuted at number 1 on the Oricon Weekly Charts and sold over 477,000 copies. On the yearly rankings, the singled ranked at 68th place and in 1985 at 66th place.

In December she released her 10th studio album "Windy Shadow", including singles "Pink no Mozart"," Heart no Earring", and 8 newly written tracks. In this album, Seiko has self-written one song in this album titled "Bara to Pistol". The album debuted at number 1 on the Oricon Weekly chart. In the same month, she made appeared on Kohaku for the fifth time.

=== 1985–1986 ===
Throughout 1985, she had been very turbulent in her own private life, beginning in January with the break-up with the singer Hiromi Go, followed by the announcement of her engagement with actor Masaki Kanda in February, marriage in April, and the ceremony in June. As a result, the musical activities were minimized in comparison with previous years, lead to the "hiatus", as it was thought by Japanese residents as her official retirement.

In January, she released her twentieth single, "Tenshi no Wink", written by Amii Ozaki. Despite debuting at number 1 on the Oricon Weekly Charts and selling over 414,000 copies, the song also promoted the Daihatsu Charade. At the time, it was her last single reaching sales numbers over 400,000 (which later was overcome by the 1 million seller "Anata ni Aitakute" in 1996). Between April and May, her Seiko Prism Agency concert tour was held before her hiatus.

In May 1985, Seiko released her twenty-first single, "Boy no Kisetsu", the second consecutive single written by Amii. It became her first single in which both the A- and B-side were part of movie soundtracks, as a theme song for the film Penguin's Memory: Shiawase Monogatari and the B-side track, "Caribbean Wind", being part of the soundtrack for "Caribbean: Ai no Symphony". She played in the latter in her 4th main role and alongside her husband Kanda, with the movie taking place throughout late 1984. The single itself debuted at number 1 on the Oricon Weekly Charts and sold over 356,000 copies. On the yearly Oricon rankings, the singled reached number 19.

In June 1985, she released her 11th studio album, "The 9th Wave". The album includes ten newly recorded singles, including "Tenshi no Wink" and "Boy no Kisetsu". The album debuted at number 1 on the Oricon Weekly Charts, and that same month, she released her first English single, "Dancing Shoes", under her own English stage-name, simply named Seiko. The single was released on day of her marriage ceremony, and was recorded in February 1985 in New York City. There were other plans that she may debut as a singer overseas, but the plans were scrapped by the marriage announcement few months later. The single was released during her hiatus in June of that year. Despite little promotion, the single managed to debut at number 1 on Oricon Weekly Charts and stayed at number 65 on the Oricon Yearly Charts.

After her marriage in August 1985, she released her first English studio album, "Sound Of My Heart". The album itself became very notable for its production, which featured members from the band Chicago, Billy Joel, and record producer Phil Ramone. During the recording of the single itself, there was a plan for the whole project to be released overseas, but it was only released domestically in Japan, debuting at number 2 on the Oricon Weekly Charts. During that same month, she released her third home-video release, "Seiko Call: Live 85", featuring footage from the Seiko Prism Agency tour from that same year, but the release failed to chart. On 31 December 1985, she made her sixth appearance on Kohaku at the NHK Hall.

During her pregnancy in 1986, she released her follow-up studio album, "Supreme", with a total of ten newly written songs, including one by herself. The album debuted at number 1 on Oricon Weekly Charts and sold over 699,000 copies. The album has been received well by critics and won Best Album Award at the 28th Japan Record Awards. During the same year, Seiko provided lyrics for another artist under her pen-name Seiko for the first time, on the single, "Kuchibiru ni Network", written by Ryuichi Sakamoto and performed by idol-singer Yukiko Okada. At the end of year, she made her seventh Kohaku television appearance, performing one of her singles from the released album. On 1 October 1986, she gave birth to her child, Sayaka.

=== 1987–1989 ===
During the period leading up to her marriage in 1985, Seiko had not announced whether she would continue performing or retire. Compared to her senior singer, Momoe Yamaguchi, who retired after marriage, Seiko's will and support from her husband for a continuing career lead to her receiving nickname "Mama Doll-mother, works as an idol". Although she made a comeback, live tours and releases were not as frequent and busy as previously.

In April 1987, she fully resumed her activities by releasing her twenty-second single, "Strawberry Time", her first after a 22-month hiatus. Until the release of twenty-fifth single, the singles received no promotion usage. There were originally no plans for the single release, and it was planned to be the only a part of the upcoming new studio album under the same title, but was released due to the singer's demands. The single debuted at number 1 on the Oricon Weekly Charts and sold over 317,000 copies. On the yearly Oricon rankings, the single itself charted at number 5.

One month later, she released the new studio album under same titles as the included single, "Strawberry Time", featuring nine songs, with one written by herself. The album debuted at number 1 on the Oricon Weekly Charts and had sold over 1,000,000 copies, one of her best selling albums in her career. During the same month, Seiko launched her first live tour after the hiatus, called "Seiko Super Diamonds Revolution", which continued into the following month. In September 1987, she released her fourth home-video release under the same name, which includes footage from her live tour.

In November 1987, Seiko released her twenty-third single, "Pearl White-Eve", written by Senri Oe. The single also debuted at number 1 on the Oricon Weekly charts and sold over 202,000 copies. On the yearly Oricon charts, the single charted at number 48. On 31 December 1987, Seiko made her eighth television appearance on Kohaku at the NHK Hall.

In April 1988, Seiko released her twenty-fourth single, "Marrakech", written by Steve Kipner and Paul Bliss. The single debuted at number 1 on the Oricon Weekly charts and sold over 182,000 copies. The single charted at number 43 on the yearly Oricon rankings.

In May 1988, Seiko released her fifteenth studio album, "Citron Fully", produced by David Foster and recorded in Los Angeles in late 1987. Seiko's only album produced by Foster includes "Marrakech" as well as nine other songs, one of them being a duet with Foster himself, titled "Every Little Hurt". Another track from the album, "Zoku: Akai Sweet Pea", represents the continuation of the story from the 1982 single. With this album, Seiko completely distanced herself from her idol image and switched her focus on being a professional singer. "Citron Fully" was her last studio album which debuted at number 1 on the Oricon Weekly Charts.

That same month, Seiko released her twenty-fifth single, "Tabitachi Wa Freesia". It became the first single that credited Seiko as a songwriter and the first that received a triple promotion: One being a television image song for Orient Express' campaign called "Orient Express 88", and the theme song for the Fuji Television television program "Naruhodo! The World". The B-side track, "Angel Tears", written by Anri, was also promoted as a commercial song for the pharmaceutical company Yamanouchi's product "Kakonal". The song itself became her last single debuting at number 1 on the Oricon Weekly Charts, and sold over 209,000 copies. On 31 December 1988, Seiko herself appeared in Kōhaku Uta Gassen for the ninth time.

In June 1989, Seiko left Sun Music Production after her contract expired, in which she was under custody since her pre-debut times, and in August of that year, she established her own private-affiliated office, Fantic, along with her brother, Mitsushisa Kamachi, who became the representative director and president. Establishing her independence had been her long-term dream since 1985, stating that she wanted "to make debuting in overseas easier and effectively which in the previouse office it has been difficult to manage". The following month, in September 1989, she released her 5th home video release, "Sweet Spark Stream", which included footage from her 1988 live tour under the same title.

In November 1989, she released her twenty-sixth single, "Precious Heart". It was written by Seiko herself, and was the first album of hers being produced by Hirofumi Sato, which came after parting ways with her long-time producer Muneo Wakamatsu. Despite being a moderate success, the song itself received promotion as a commercial song on television advertisements for the Subaru Rex, for Subaru. The single debuted as number 2 on the Oricon Weekly Charts and sold over 129,000 copies. It was her only single to be released that year.

After a 19-month hiatus on releasing albums, she released her sixteenth studio album, "Precious Moment", in December 1989, with all songs being written by Seiko herself, and debuted at number 6 on the Oricon Weekly Charts. During that same month, Seiko launched her own Precious Moment concert tour, which lasted throughout much of December 1989 and into January 1990.

=== 1990–1992 ===
Although some up-and-coming female singers like Namie Amuro and Hamasaki became successful after the end of the 1980s, most pop idols from Matsuda's era disappeared as the golden age of idols began to fade away, except Matsuda, who was still going strong, releasing single after single. After finishing all of her preparations for her personal agency in late 1989, Seiko received her dreams by releasing her songs overseas, including the United States.

In April 1990, she released her second single, "All The Way To Heaven", written by Michael Jay and Michael Cruz. The single was released under her stage name, Seiko, and solely in England but never had a release in Japan. The single failed to chart. That same month, she released her 6th home-video release, Precious Moment, which includes footage from her Precious Moment tour in 1989–1990. The following single released in late May 1990, "The Right Combination", a duet song with the vocalist from the Boston-based boyband New Kids on the Block, Donnie Wahlberg. Each of the versions released in different countries contained different B-side tracks. The single achieved moderate success, releasing over 300,000 copies and charted on various weekly charts in Canada, Australia, England, Japan, and reached #54 on the Billboard Hot 100 in the United States in late July. Shortly after, Seiko released her second English album in June 1990, also under the same name as stage name-Seiko, and released in several countries including both Japan and the United States, as well as being promoted in magazines including Us Weekly and Intersect. The album itself debuted at number 2 on the Oricon Weekly charts and sold over 300,000 copies in Japan, over 150,000 copies in both the United States and Europe, and over 70,000 copies in Southeast Asia. To promote the album further, her fourth English single, "Who's That Boy", was released in October 1990. The song itself was originally included in her self-titled Seiko album, but the single version includes re-recorded vocals. Despite the single failing to reach the rankings, the song itself also made it into television advertisements for the Subaru Rex.

In Fall 1990, Seiko temporarily returned to Japan to release her thirty-first single in November, "We Are Love", written by Masanori Sasaji. The single debuted at number 16 on the Oricon Weekly Charts and sold over 63,000 copies. The following month, Seiko released her follow-up album under the same title, "We Are Love". The album contained all songs written and produced by Seiko herself, but the title song itself had changes. The album version for "We Are Love" includes an English duet version with American actor Jeff Nichols, while the single version was performed in Japanese. The album debuted at number 3 on the Oricon Weekly Charts.

In May 1991, Seiko released her fifth cover, alongside her first English-cover album, "Eternal". The album contains ballads which Seiko personally wanted to sing, and the album itself debuted at number 3 on the Oricon Weekly Charts. Between May and July 1991, her Amusement Park tour played across Japan. In August, she released her seventh home video release "Seiko Clip", which contains videoclips, alongside her English songs, from both her "Seiko" and "Eternal" albums. In September, she released her eighth home-video release which includes footage from the concert tour held that year. In December, she released compilation album, "Bible", which includes a mix of singles, B-side tracks and selective tracks from the albums. The series of compilations work under the "Bible" subtitle continues as of 2023. The album debuted at number 8 on the Oricon Weekly Rankings, charting for a total of 22 weeks and sold over 500,000 copies. "Bible" became one of her most successful albums in her career, the album itself certified double-platinum from the Recording Industry Association of Japan in 2004. Throughout the two first years of the 1990s, Seiko had been focusing on marketing her performances overseas and releasing songs primarily in English, but by 1992, she primarily focused with her home country of Japan.

In February 1992, Seiko had released her thirty-second single, "Kitto, Mata Aeru....", which became her first main single that was composed by her without writers. The song served as a theme song for the TBS television drama, "Otona no Sentaku", in which Seiko starred as herself. The single had a quite successful-debut at number 4 on the Oricon Weekly Charts, and sold over 323,000 copies. The single became her first single in three years to reach the Top 10 in the Weekly Charts. Despite the single reaching number 63 in the 1992 yearly rankings, the single itself received the Best Vocalist Award at the 34th Japan Record Awards, and was certified gold by the RIAJ, becoming one of her most successful singles. One month after the release in March 1992, she released her twentieth studio album, "Nouvelle Vague" (or "1992 Nouvelle Vague"), her first album where all the songs were composed by herself with the assistance of her long-time collaborator Ryo Ogura. The album debuted at number 8 on the Oricon Weekly Charts. In June 1992, Seiko released her ninth home-video release with the same title, which contains some of the videoclips from the album "Nouvelle Vague". Between June and July of that same year, she performed another concert tour under the same name. In August 1992, she released her thirty-third single, "Anata no Subete ni Naritai". The song itself served as theme song for the continuation of the TBS television drama "Otona no Sentaku". Originally included in her 1992 Nouvelle Vague album, in comparison to the previous single, it did not sell well, and reached only number 31 on the Oricon Weekly Charts, selling only 46,000 copies. In October 1992, she released her tenth home-video release, "LIVE 1992 Nouvelle Vague", which included footage from the concert. In December 1992, she release her twenty-first studio album, "Sweet Memories '93". The album contains four new songs, a duet with her daughter Sayaka, and re-arranged and re-recorded songs selected by Seiko herself. The album debuted at number 12 on the Oricon Weekly Charts, and that same month, she launched her first yearly annual Christmas Dinner Show, which have been held ever since, with the exceptions of 2021 and 2022.

=== 1993–1995 ===
In April 1993, Seiko had managed to release another hit song, the thirty-fourth single "Taisetsu na Anata". The song served as a theme song for the TBS television drama "Watashitte Busu Dattano?", starring herself. The single debut at number 7 on the Oricon Weekly Charts and sold over 323,000 copies. In the 1993 Oricon Yearly Rankings, the single charted at number 74. In May, she released her thirty-fifth single "A Touch of Destiny" and her twenty-second studio album "Diamond Expression" on the same day. The single served as an opening theme for the TV Asahi television program "Oh L Club". The single did not become as popular as the previous, charting only at number 51 and sold merely 14,000 copies. The album debuted at number 4 on the Oricon Weekly Charts. For promotion, Seiko held a concert tour between June and July. The same month, Seiko released her eleventh home-video release "Seiko Clips3 1992 Diamond Expression", which contains some of the videoclips from the album "Diamond Expression". In November, she released her twenty-third studio album "A Time for love", her first fully themed Christmas album with newly recorded songs written and produced by herself. The album debuted at number 21 on the Oricon Weekly Charts. The same month she released her twelfth home-video release "Live Diamond Expression", which includes footage from the concert tour.

In May 1994, she released her thirty-seventh single "Mou Ichido, Hajime kara". The song served as an ending theme for the Nippon TV television program "The Wide". The single debuted at number 22 on the Oricon Weekly Charts and sold over 65,000 copies. In June, she released her twenty-fourth studio album "Glorious Revolution" and her thirteenth home-video release "Seiko Clips4 Glorious Revolution", which contains music video clips from the album released. The album debuted at number 8 on the Oricon Weekly Charts. The same month, Seiko started the "Glorious Revolution" concert tour which lasted until August. In October, she released her fourteenth home-video release, "Live Glorious Revolution". In December, she released her thirty-eighth single "Kagayaita Kisetsu he Tabitatou". Until the then, she used her full stage name in the credits for lyrics, this time she used new pen name, Meg.C., inspired by the american actress Meg Ryan. It served as a television commercial song for Takano Yuri's esthetic clinic "Beauty Clinic". The single debuted at number 12 on the Oricon Weekly Charts and sold over 371,000 copies. On the Oricon Yearly rankings, the single charted at number 94. The same month Seiko appeared on Kohaku for the 10th time, making the first appearance on the prestige program in five years.

In March 1995, she released her fifteen home-video release "Video Bible: Best Hits Video History". In April, she released her thirty-ninth single "Suteki ni Once Again". The B-side track "Omoide no Nagisa no Balcony" is a continuation to the single "Nagisa no Balcony" from 1983. The song served as an ending theme to the TV Asahi television program "Kinkin no Koto Koukishin". The single debuted at number 22 on the Oricon Weekly charts and sold over 10,000 copies. In May, she released her twenty-fifth studio album "It's Style '95". Between June and August 1995, Seiko performed the "Glorious Revolution" concert tour. In June 1995, "Seiko Clips5 It's Style'95" was released, which includes music videoclips album released the same year. In November, her seventeenth home-video release "LIVE It's Style'95" was released, including footage from the concert tour. Afterwards, Seiko left Sony Music. Until her return in 2002, Sony continued to release compilation albums without her involvement. In December 1995, Seiko appeared on Kohaku for the 11th time.

=== 1996–1998 ===
In April 1996, she released her fortieth single "Anata ni Aitakute ~Missing You~" (lit. "I want to meet you ~Missing you~"). It became her first single to be released under Mercury Records by Universal Music Japan. It served as an ending theme to the TV Asahi television program "Beat Takeshi no Tackle". B-side track "Ashita he Nukedashite Yukou" served as an opening theme to the television anime Mysterious Thief Saint Tail. The single which would become her last number-one single to chart on the Oricon Weekly Charts as of 2023. It sold over 1.1 million copies and it was certified a million-seller by RIAJ. On the yearly Oricon rankings, the single charted at number 14. In 2020, Seiko spoke about the production process of the single on the television program "Kanjam Kanzennen Show".

After six years, Seiko tried for the third time to break into the United States music market. In April, she released her fourth single "Let's Talk About It" written by singer-songwriter, Robbie Nevil. The song was released under the previously used stage name Seiko. The single was released only abroad, however it failed to enter the charts. In May, she released her third English studio album "Was it the future" fully produced by Nevil. Although the album failed to chart on the American, European or Canadian or Asian music rankings, it debuted at number 12 on the Oricon Weekly Charts. Two days after the album release, her second duet-single "I'll Be There For You" with Nevil was released. The song served as a theme song for the movie "Sweet Evil", starring herself. The single failed to chart in overseas markets, however managed reach number 35 on the Oricon Weekly Charts. The same month, she released her twenty-seventh studio album "Vanity Fair", the first to be released by Mercury Records. It includes one single along with its B-side track and 8 newly written tracks. The album debuted at number 2 on the Oricon Weekly Charts. In June, Seiko launcher her "Vanity Fair" concert tour. In November, she released her forty-third single "Sayonara no Shunkan". The song served as a theme song to the television drama "Dear Woman" and debuted at number 5. In December, Seiko had many releases on the charts: Her twenty-eight studio album "Guardian Angel" at number 10 on the Oricon Weekly Charts; her fifth English single "Good for you" written by Nevil, at number 37 on the Billboard Dance Chart; her twenty-first home-video release "Was it future". Her nineteenth home-video release "Bon Voyage: The Best Lives and Clips" and twentieth home-video release "Live Vanity Fair'96" were released on the same day. With the success of the single "Anata ni Aitakute", Seiko made an appearance on Kohaku for the twelfth time.

In April 1997, she released her forty-first single "Watashi Dake no Tenshi:Angel". Seiko dedicated whole song to her daughter Sayaka. The single cover depicts the hand of her daughter. It served as an image song for Unimat Holding. The B-side track "Anata no Soba ni" served as an ending theme to the TV Asahi television program "Saturday Night at the Mysteries". The single debuted at number 5 on the Oricon Weekly Charts. As of 2023, it is Seiko's last single which sold over one hundred thousand copies, selling 248,000. In May, she released her twenty-ninth studio album "My Story". It includes one single along with its B-side track and 8 newly written songs. The album debuted at number 5 on the Oricon Weekly Charts. Between June and July 1997, she held her "My Story" concert tour. In June, she released her accompanying twenty-second home-video release "My Story", which includes interviews and selected songs from the album. In October, she released her twenty-third home video release "Seiko Live'97 My Story", including footage from the live tour. In December, she released her forty-second single "Gone with the rain". It served as an ending theme to the TBS television program "Wonderful". The single debuted at number 28 on the Oricon Weekly Charts. The same month, she released her thirtieth album "Sweetest Time". The album is divided, half of the songs being performed in English and Japanese each. The album debuted at number 12.

1998 marked a decline in popularity, which was shown by low numbers of copies sold for both singles and albums, and difficulty for her singles to chart in the top 30. She and her longtime collaborator Ryo Ogura split, reuniting in 2005. In May, she released her thirty-first studio album "Forever", consisting of completely new songs. The album debuted at number 12. In June 1998, Seiko released her forty-second single "Koisuru Omoi: Fall in Love". Originally part of the studio album "Forever", the song served as an ending theme to the NTV television program Super TV "Jōhō Saizensen". The single debuted at number 34. The same month, she released her twenty-fourth home-video release "Forever", and the following month the "Forever" tour was launched, performing until November. In July, Seiko starred in Armageddon as a Japanese tourist. In October, she released her twenty-fifth home-video release "Seiko Live'98 Forever". It became her first video to be released before the concert tour was finished. Soon after the concert tour ended, she released her forty-eighth single "Touch the Love". It served as a theme song for the Disney Video in which Seiko starred herself. The single debuted at number 66. In December 1998, she released her twenty-sixth home video release "Seiko '96〜'98" which consists of the music videos from the singles released 1996–1998.

=== 1999–2003 ===
In 1999, after some discussion with her previous management agency's producer, Mueno Wakamatsu, Seiko transferred her staff from private agency Fantastic to Wakamatu's agency Green Mark Music. Due to these events, Seiko couldn't hold her Budokan live or Concert tour, instead in October she launched her first live house tour "Zepp". In July, Seiko appeared in Drop Dead Gorgeous, in which she stars as Tina/Seiko Howard. The same month, she released her forty-ninth single "Kanashimi no Port". The song served as an insert theme song to the Fuji TV television drama "Out: Tsumatachi no Hanzai". The single debuted at number 27 on the Oricon Weekly Charts. In December, she released her thirty-second studio album "Eien no Shojo". Unlike the previous studio albums, none of the tracks were written and produced by herself. Instead, she collaborated with the musicians and writers who helped her in the 80's, such as Masanori Sasaji, Akira Inoue or Takashi Matsumoto, who wrote all the songs. The album includes lyrics written by her daughter under the pen-name Alice. The album track "Sakura no En" was written by Masaaki Oomura, who died in 1997. Originally, the song was meant to be performed by another singer, however after the pressure by Matsumoto and his own personal desire, Oomura's staff decided to let it be sung by Seiko. The same month, she appeared on Kohaku for the 13th time.

In March 2000 her twenty-seventh home-video release "Seiko Matsuda Zepp Tour 1999" was released. For her 20th anniversary as an idol, in May the fiftieth single "20th Party" was released. The V-side track includes a song written by her daughter, which was previously included in her studio album "Eien no Shojo". The single debuted at number 17. In June, she released 2 singles and 1 studio album: The single "Shanghai Love Song", a collaboration with Shinji Harada. The single debuted at number 37. The second single "Unseasonable Shore" served as an ending theme to the Nippon TV program "The Sunday". The song debuted at number 35. Her thirty-third studio album "20th Party" has half of the songs written by Ryo Ogura. The album debuted at number 16. Between July and August, Seiko held her first concert tour 2 years, "Seiko Matsuda Concert Tour 2000". In September, she released the duet single "True Love Story" with her first boyfriend, Hiromi Go, produced by Max Matsuura. It served as a television commercial song to the Wacoal's "Point Shaver". The single debuted at number 7, making it her first in 3 years to be in the Top 10. In November she released her fifty-fourth single "The Sound of Fire". The song served as an image song to the 2001 International Open Figure Skating Championships. The single debuted at number 46. In December, her twenty-eighth home-video release "Seiko Matsuda Concert Tour 2000 20th Party" was released, she also made an appearance on Kohaku, for the 14th time.

In June 2001, she released her fifty-fifth single "Anata shika Mienai". The same month, she released her thirty-fourth studio album "LOVE & EMOTION Vol.1". Between July and August, she was on her "LOVE & EMOTION" tour. In November, she released her fifty-sixth single "Ai♡Ai:100% Pure♥Love". It served as a theme song to the Fuji TV television program "100%Kyaeen!". The single debuted at number 49. The same month, she released her thirty-fifth studio album "LOVE & EMOTION Vol.2" and thirtieth home-video release "Seiko Matsuda Concert Tour 2001 LOVE & EMOTION". The album continues the album released in June. One of the songs was written by her daughter, the second since 1999. It debuted at number 43. It become her last work to be released under Universal Music Japan, formerly known as Kitty MME. The home-video release includes footage from the live tour launched on the same year. She made appearance on Kohaku for the 15th time, the last for the next ten years.

In 2002, Seiko returned to her former music label, Sony. At the same time, Seiko transferred once again from former producers' agency Green Park Music to her private agency Fantic. In April, Seiko made her fourth attempt to publish successfully in the United States by releasing the English single "All to you". Unlike the previous English works, she used her full stage name Seiko Matsuda. The single at number 19 on the Billboard Dance charts, number 1 on the Chicago Dance Chart, number 3 on the Boston Dance charts and number 10 on the Los Angeles Dance Chart. In June, she released her 36th album, her sixth English album "area62" under Indie label HIP-O RECORDS. The album was exclusively to be released in the United States. Some of the songs were produced by her previous English collaborator, Robbie Nevil. However, this attempt wasn't successful as well, as it did not appear on the Billboard charts or any other independent music charts. The same month, she released her fifty-seventh single "Sutekina Ashita". Between June and August, Seiko held her "Jewel Box" tour. In July, her daughter Sayaka made her debut as a singer under the stage name Sayaka with the single "ever since". On the tour, her daughter made an appearance and they performed a duet together. In November, she released her thirty-second home-video release "Seiko Matsuda Concert Tour 2002 Jewel Box". In December, the song "Just for tonight " from the album "area62" was released as a single, however it only charted 15th on the Billboard Dance charts.

In June 2003, she released her sixtieth single "Call me". The single debuted at number 17. Between June and August, Seiko held her "Seiko Matsuda Concert Tour 2003 Call me". In November, she released her thirty-third home-video release, which includes footage from the live tour.

=== 2004–2008 ===
In May 2004, she released her sixty-first single "Aitai". It served as a television commercial song to the Daikyo Incorporated, in which Seiko starred together with her daughter Sayaka. The single debuted at number 12 on the Oricon Weekly charts. In the yearly Oricon rankings, the single stayed at number 247. As of 2023, it became her last single to sell more than 4,000 copies. In June, she released her thirty-seventh studio album "Sunshine", the first in two year and the last to be produced by Harada. The album has received positive feedback, debuting at number 6 on the Oricon Weekly charts, the first in the Top 10 since 1997. Between June and July, the "Seiko Matsuda Concert Tour 2004 Sunshine" was performed, In July, she released the duet "Smile on me" with comedian Takaaki Ishibashi under the stage name "Seiko & Crazy.T". It served as a theme song to the sport television program "S☆1 Baseball". The single debuted at number 18. In November 2004, she released her thirty-fifth home-video release "Seiko Matsuda Concert Tour 2004 Sunshine".

2005 was Seiko's 25th debut anniversary and marked a period of declining sales. In February 2005, she released her sixty-third single "Eien sae kanji yoru", produced by Ogura. Until 2010, Seiko's singles would continue to sell low numbers. In April 2005, she released her thirty-eighth album "Fairy", fully produced by Yuji Toriyama. The album debuted at number 7 on the Oricon Weekly charts. Between June and August, she launched her national "Fairy" tour. In response to strong requests from Taiwanese fans, the final performance of the live tour was held in Xinzhuang, Taiwan. It became he first overseas performance since her debut in 1980. Seiko performed some songs in the Chinese. In August 2005, she released her sixty-fourth single "I'll fall in love", fully produced by Ogura. With this single, she fully reunited with her collaborator from the 1990s, Ryo Ogura. The song served as a theme song to the Japanese remake-version of the American movie Bewitched. The single debuted at number 30 on the Oricon Weekly charts. In September, she released her sixty-fifth single "Shiawase na Kimochi". The same month, she released her first Chinese album "I'll fall in love 愛的禮物". In November 2005, she released her thirty-seventh home-video release which includes footage from the live tour held on the same year. In December 2005, she released her thirty-ninth album "Under the beautiful stars", produced by Ryo Ogura. The album charted at number 34.

In April 2006, she released her sixty-sixth single "Bless you", fully written by her daughter Sayaka under pen name Jun Uehara. The single debuted at number 29. One month later in May, she released her sixty-seventh single "WE ARE" under pen-name PawPaw. It became Sayaka's second single to be written for her mother. The same month, she released her fortieth studio album "Bless you", fully produced by Ryo Ogura. The album debuted at number 14. Between June and July, the "Seiko Matsuda Concert Tour 2006 bless you" followed. In July, released the compilation album "Seiko Matsuda", which consisted of 74 CDs and debuted at number 96, becoming the highest-priced album in the Oricon history at the price of 100,000 yen (about 850 dollars). Hibari Misora, a well-known enka singer from the 1950s held the previous record with her 1989 album "Kyō no Ware ni Asu wa Katsu" (60,000 yen). In September 2006, she released her thirty-ninth home-video release, which includes footage from the live tour held on the same year. In December 2006, she released her second English cover-album "Eternal II", which continues her cover album released back in 90s. As of 2023, among all original and cover albums, Eternal II has charted very lowly, at number 54 on the Oricon Weekly Charts. During the Christmas dinner show, she met with the director of Sun Music, Hideyoshi Aizawa, for the first time in 17 years. The following year, in March 2007, she entered into a business partnership with Sun Music.

In April 2007, NHK broadcast her documentary "Matsuda Seiko: Josei no Jidai no Monogatari", produced by herself. A documentary program focused on her way of the life and women of the same generation who sympathize with it. The audience share was around 9.3%. In May, she released her sixty-eighth single "Namida ga Tada Koboreru dake". In June 2007, she released her forty-second original album "Baby's Breath". The entire album has been written and composed by herself, her first completely self-produced album. The album debuted at number 19. In August 2007, she released her duet single "Manatsu no Yoru no Yume" with Takashi Fujii. In September, she released her forty-first home-video release, which includes footage from the live tour held the same year. In November, she released her seventieth single "Christmas no Yoru". It was her second Christmas themed single, the first in 20 years.

In April 2008, she released her seventieth-first single "Hanabira May Kisetsu ni", fully written and produced by herself. In May, she released her fortieth-third original album "My pure Melody", her second original album to be fully written and produced by herself. The album track "Hoshizora no Shita no Kimi he" served as image song to the live-action version of the movie Grave of the Fireflies. In June, she released her seventieth-second single "Love is all". The same month, the "Seiko Matsuda Concert Tour 2008 My pure melody" launched, lasting until August. In July 2008, the live-action version of the Ghibli movie Grave of the Fireflies premiered, in which Seiko starred as Seita's mother, it became her first movie role in 7 years. In October, she released her seventieth-third single "Kagayaita Kisetsu". It became her last single to be released under Sony before moving back to Universal Music Japan. The same month, she released her forty-third home-video release, which includes footage of the concert tour held the same year.

=== 2009–2014 ===
In June 2009, Seiko announced her transfer from the Sony to Universal Music Japan. The same month, Seiko launched her "Seiko Matsuda Concert Tour 2009 My Precious Songs". In August, her previous label Sony re-released 16 of Matsuda's early albums under the Blu-spec CD format. Thirteen of these entered the Oricon Top 100 Album Chart at the same time, surpassing the record set by Hibari Misora (12 albums) and making her the first female artist to do so. In November 2009, she released her fortieth-fifth home-video release, which includes footage from the live tour.

In 2010, Seiko marked her 30th debut anniversary. This period saw a revival of her popularity, mainly seen in the sales and charts rankings. In April, Matsuda made a guest appearance on Fox Broadcasting Company's popular TV dramas "Bones". In May, she released her seventy-fifth single "Ikutsu no Yoke wo Kazoetara". The song served as a theme song to the television drama General Rouge no Gaisen. It has become Seiko's first television drama song to be promoted in 14 years. The single debuted at number 12 on the Oricon Weekly charts, her first single since 2004 to debut in the Top 20. The same month, Seiko released her forty-fourth original album "My Prelude", produced by herself and written with the assistance of Ogura. The album debuted at number 4. It has become her first album to appear in Top 5 since 1997. Between June and August, the "Seiko Matsuda Concert Tour 2010 My Prelude" was underway. In October, Seiko made a special guest appearance on David Fosters's concert tour "David Foster & Friends Japan Tour 2010". In November 2010, her forty-eighth home-video release was released, including footage from the live tour held the same year.

In June 2011, she released her forty-fifth original album "Cherish", produced and written by Seiko herself. Unlike the previous albums, it had no singles released before or after and includes 10 newly written songs. The album debuted at number 10, the tour starting the same month. The "Seiko Matsuda Concert Tour 2011 Cherish" lasted until August. In September, she was invited to perform in American music producer Quincy Jones's concert at the Hollywood Bowl in Los Angeles. In November, she released her seventy-sixth single "Tokubetsu na Koibito", fully written and produced by Mariya Takeuchi. This is the first time in about 26 years that a female artist provided lyrics and music for Seiko. The single debuted at number 14. The same month, she released her fiftieth home-video release, which includes footage from the live tour and made appearance on Kohaku for the 16th time, the first time since 2001. Instead of performing her original song, she covered Kyu Sakamoto's Sukiyaki along with her daughter Sayaka.

In May 2012, Seiko released her seventy-seventh single "Namida no Shizuku", written and produced by herself. It served as an image song to the movie Chronicle of My Mother. The single debuted at number 20 and sold over 800,000 copies. One month later, she released her forty-sixth original album "Very Very", produced by herself and co-written with Ogura. The album debuted at number 9 on the Oricon weekly charts and charted for 4 weeks. The same month, the "Seiko Matsuda Concert Tour 2012 Very Very" followed, which lasted until August. In September 2012, Seiko has performed as a guest vocalist on the album "Esprit De Four" by the contemporary Jazz super-group Fourplay. In October 2012, Seiko made special guest appearance at "Tokyo Jazz 2012" along with Bob James. In November 2012, she released her fifty-second home video release, which includes footage from the live tour.

In May 2013, she released her seventy-eighth single "LuLu!!", written by Chara. The single debuted at number 23. In June 2013, Seiko was credited as a writer and producer to the Takashi Fujii's single "She is my new town". On the B-side track, she provided backing vocals. The same month the "Seiko Matsuda Concert Tour 2013 A Girl in the Wonder Land" started, which lasted until July and she released her forty-seven studio album "A Girl in the Wonder Land". In August 2013, Seiko appeared as a secret guest on the first Quincy Jones live concert in Japan for 30 years. In October, she released "due tinsel Yume ga Samete" with Chris Hart. The single won the Planning award on the 55th Japan Record Awards. In December 2013, she appeared on Kohaku together with Chris Hart. Until 2020, Seiko made yearly appearances on the program.

In February 2014, Seiko moved away from the Fantic and established her new agency Felicia club. In May, she released her eightieth single "I love you: Anata no Hohoemi ni". In June 2014, she released her forty-eighth original album "Dream & Fantasy", produced by Seiko herself, the "Pre 35th Anniversary: Seiko Matsuda Concert Tour 2014 Dream & Fantasy" which lasted until August following.

=== 2015–2019 ===
The year of 2015 marked her 35th debut anniversary. In June 2015, she released her forty-ninth original album "Bibbidi-Bobbidi-Boo". It is also the last album in which her long-period collaborator Ryo Ogura was involved. The same month, she launched concert tour "35th Anniversary: Seiko Matsuda Concert Tour 2015 "Bibbidi-Bobbidi-Boo". In October 2015 she released her eighty-first single "Eien no Motto Hate", written by Yumi Matsutoya, who used the same pen-name as during the releases of 1980s. It is the first single in 31 years since the 1984 single "Alice in the Land of Time" with music composed by Matsutoya. This single was produced to commemorate the 35th anniversary of his debut. It has been released under Universal's sub-label EMI Records. The song served as the theme song to the Japanese dubbed version of the movie Pan. It received Best singer award on the 57th Japan Record Awards, for the first time in 23 years.

In June 2016, she released her fiftieth album Shining Star. It has been produced, written and composed on her own. The "Seiko Matsuda Concert Tour 2016 Shining Star" starting the same month which lasted until September. In September 2016, she released her eighty-second single "Bare no youni Saite Sakura no youni Chitte", written and produced by Yoshiki (X Japan). As of 2023, it is Seiko's last single to be released in a physical medium. The song was performed on Kohaku with Yoshiki playing the piano.

In March 2017, Seiko challenged herself with anew music genre: Jazz. She released her first jazz album and third English-cover album "Seiko Jazz", produced by Shigeyuki Kawashima and arranged by David Matthews. The album has won the Planning award at 59th Japan Record Awards and Best Jazz Album of the year at the 32nd Japan Gold Disc Award. In June 2017, she released her fifty-first original album "Daisy", the "Seiko Matsuda Concert Tour 2017 Daisy" starting the same month and lasting until September. In November 2017, Seiko held her first jazz themed live concert "SEIKO JAZZ 2017" at Orchard Hall.

In 2018, following the success of the first jazz concert in 2017, she held three other jazz themed concerts in January, February and November. In June 2018, she released her fifty-second original album "Merry-go-round". The album track "Atarashii Ashita" served as a theme song to the television drama "Machi Kouba no Onna" .The same month, she launched the "Seiko Matsuda Concert Tour 2018 Merry-go-round", which lasted until September.

In February 2019, she launched her second jazz alum and in overall fourth English-cover album "SEIKO JAZZ 2", produced and arranged by Mervyn Warren. For promotion Seiko launched the "SEIKO JAZZ 2" concert tour. Between June and August 2019, her "Pre 40th Anniversary Seiko Matsuda Concert Tour 2019 Seiko's Single Collection" was running.

=== 2020–present ===
2020 marked the fortieth anniversary of Matsuda's debut. Due to the global COVID-19 pandemic, initially planned celebrations, releases, and events were modified or cancelled.

In March 2020, what was supposed to be a one-day live concert "Premium Live" on Seiko's birthday, and between June and October a large anniversary concert tour "Seiko Matsuda Concert Tour 2020 "Singles & Very Best Songs Collection", were canceled due to government restrictions. In April, Seiko released the digital single "Sweet Memories: Amai Kioku", self covering her song from the single released in 1983. In June, the digital single "Ruriiro no Chikyuu 2020", self covering her song from the album "Supreme" was released. In October 2020, Seiko launched her first online concert "40th Anniversary Seiko Matsuda 2020 Romantic Studio Live" through the U-Next streaming service. In September, Matsuda released her first self-cover album and fifty-third album in general "Seiko Matsuda 2020". The album consist of 4 re-recordings of her songs selected by herself and 6 newly written songs. The album debuted at number 3 on the Oricon Weekly Charts. In December, Matsuda was awarded with a Special Achievement Award during the 62nd Japan Record Awards.

Unable to properly celebrate her anniversary debut in 2020, the self-cover concept carried over into 2021. In May, she released her re-recorded version of her 1980 hit single "Aoi Sangoshou: Blue Lagoon", accompanied with a music video. For that occasion, she had her hair styled on her Seiko-chan haircut, which fans had the chance to see for the first time in 40 years. In June 2021, she released "Jikan no Kuni no Alice: Alice In the World of Time", a re-recording of her hit single released in 1984. After some restrictions were lifted during the summer, Matsuda held her concert tour "Happy 40th Anniversary!! Seiko Matsuda Concert Tour 2020〜2021 "Singles & Very Best Songs Collection!!", originally scheduled to perform in 2020. In October, she released her second self-cover album and in general fifty-fourth original album "Seiko Matsuda 2021". Following the same format from her previous album, it consist of 5 re-recordings of her songs selected by herself and 5 newly recorded songs. The album debuted at number 4 on the Oricon Weekly charts. In November 2022, she made her debut as a director for the film "Folklore 2" released on HBO Asia. The same month, she released her sixty-second home-video release, which includes footage from the live tour held on the same year. In December 2021, while she was performing her Christmas Dinner show, she was informed by the staff about the sudden death of her only child and daughter, Sayaka Kanda. Matsuda canceled her last days of the dinner show, her mini-concerts planned to be held between 23 and 26 December, as well as declining her television appearance on Kohaku. Until 2023, she did not make any television appearances.

Following the death of her daughter, Matsuda was unable to perform on-stage for almost 3 months. Although she did not release any new material in 2022, she held dinner shows between April and May. In June, she launched her annual concert tour "Seiko Matsuda Concert Tour 2022 My Favorite Singles & Best Songs". In December, she released her 63rd home-video release.

As of 2023, Matsuda still holds annual concerts, Christmas dinner shows and New Year's Eve Countdown shows. In November 2023, it was announced that her third jazz cover album "Seiko Jazz 3" will be released on 14 February 2024. The album will be her first jazz-themed album in five years since 2019's "Seiko Jazz 2" and her first album since 2021's "Seiko Matsuda 2021". Included in the album is a jazz version of her 1982 hit song "Akai Sweet Pea", with lyrics rewritten in English and featuring a saxophone solo from American saxophonist Kenny G. It was released on 15 December 2023 as a promotional single.

== Artistry ==
=== Influences ===
Seiko has been cited by many musicians and idols as their main influence, mainly in the 1980s. She has been a secret idol for subsequent female celebrities such as Shoko Nakagawa, who called Matsuda "my God and my universe".

== Legacy ==
Matsuda is on the Top 3 list of Most No.1 albums, Most Top 10 singles and Most Top 10 albums for a solo artist in Japan. HMV Japan ranked her No. 10 Top Japanese Artist of All Time, and No. 7 Top Singer of All Time.

Matsuda is also listed as second only behind Eikichi Yazawa as an artist, in number of concerts at the Nippon Budokan. Despite the high ticket prices, her dinner show tickets are the most expensive among female artists, for many years and to this day, she performs to a sold-out crowd.

In May 2011, an Oricon survey crowned her the "No. 1 everlasting idol of all time", beating Momoe Yamaguchi, Kyōko Koizumi, Morning Musume and Akina Nakamori. Her long staying power is mainly due to her continuous re-invention of herself. She was labeled a 'Mamadol' (idol who remains popular even after having children). Her hair styles, fashion sense and makeup have all been copied by millions of girls and women in Japan and parts of Asia.

Between December 2022 and January 2023, on the survey of The best 100 80s Showa Idol held by Remindetop, Seiko placed second. The magazine with the results of the survey has been published in March and a special television program broadcast in July on the Kayo Pops television channel.

== Personal life ==
At the beginning of her career in 1980, journalists and fans of idol-singer Toshihiko Tahara from Johnny's believed that they had started dating after appearing together in a television commercial for Glico and appeared together often on music television shows, however Toshihiko claims "We were only friends the whole time and the only thing we ever did was a small kiss on the cheek."

In 1983, Matsuda was romantically linked with singer Hiromi Go. Although there were rumours of an impending engagement, Go's traditional values would have required Matsuda to give up her singing career and focus on raising a family instead. Momoe Yamaguchi, Japan's top female idol of the 1970s, had followed such a course, but Seiko ended her relationship with Go instead. Her break from tradition set a precedent for Japanese women in the 1980s and 1990s to continue their careers even after marriage.

Matsuda has been married three times. She married actor Masaki Kanda in 1985, but they divorced in 1997. Their only child and daughter, Sayaka Kanda (1986–2021), was also a singer. Her second husband, Hiroyuki Hatano, was a dentist whom she married in 1998, but divorced in 2000. On 13 June 2012, she announced her third marriage to university associate professor, Hiromasa Kawana, on her official website.

In February 1989, tabloid magazine Friday released an article with a photo of a secret meeting with Nakamori's boyfriend at the time, Masahiko Kondo in New York. A few months later in June, Seiko announced at a press conference that the tabloids "only wrote this article for money. We are only friends and mates who have debuted together in the same year, 1980, and nothing else". However, some journalists believed that this could have been one of the catalysts for Nakamori's attempted suicide in July 1989. The reason behind her suicide attempt hasn't been revealed as of 2024.

In 1995, actor Jeff Nichols published a book titled Kowareta Ai (Broken Love) in Japanese with the help of a translator, in which he described the love affair he had with Seiko between the years 1990–1993.

In 2000, shortly before Seiko's second divorce, rumors spread about her having an affair with her temporary musical collaborator Shinji Harada, who was also married at the time. However, both denied the allegations, stating that their relationship was strictly professional and "only for the music business".

In 2012, Seiko married a university professor. They are still married as of March 2026.

In 2013, Seiko was spotted with her daughter Sayaka at the funeral of Seiko's Sun Music director, Hideyoshi Aizawa.

In 2016 and 2017, Seiko caused a stir in the Japanese entertainment industry when she modeled for the lingerie company, Triumph International.

On 18 December 2021, Matsuda's only child and daughter, Sayaka Kanda, was found unconscious in the outer garden on the fourteenth floor of a hotel in Chūō ward, Sapporo. She was later pronounced dead at a hospital. The cause of death was determined to have been traumatic shock, with the Hokkaido Prefectural Police suspecting that Kanda committed suicide by jumping from an upper floor of the hotel.

On 16 October 2023, news websites reported that Matsuda donated over 10 million yen (66k dollars) to her hometown Fukuoka, which was affected by heavy rains in July of the same year.

On 26 March 2024, Matsuda graduated from the Faculty of Law at Chuo University.

== Discography ==
- Squall (1980)
- North Wind (1980)
- Silhouette (1981)
- Kazetachinu (1981)
- Pineapple (1982)
- Candy (1982)
- Utopia (1983)
- Canary (1983)
- Tinker Bell (1984)
- Windy Shadow (1984)
- The 9th Wave (1985)
- Sound of My Heart (1985)
- Supreme (1986)
- Strawberry Time (1987)
- Citron (1988)
- Precious Moment (1989)
- Seiko (1990)
- We Are Love (1990)
- Eternal (1991)
- 1992 Nouvelle Vague (1992)
- Sweet Memories '93 (1992)
- Diamond Expression (1993)
- A Time for Love (1993)
- Glorious Revolution (1994)
- It's Style '95 (1995)
- Was It The Future (1996)
- Vanity Fair (1996)
- My Story (1997)
- Forever (1998)
- Eien no Shoujo (1999)
- 20th Party (2000)
- Love & Emotion Vol.1 (2001)
- Love & Emotion Vol.2 (2001)
- Area62 (2002)
- Sunshine (2004)
- Fairy (2005)
- I'll Fall in Love (2005)
- Under the beautiful stars (2005)
- Bless You (2006)
- Baby's Breath (2007)
- My Pure Melody (2008)
- My Prelude (2010)
- Cherish (2011)
- Very Very (2012)
- A Girl in the Wonder Land (2013)
- Dream & Fantasy (2014)
- Bibbidi-Bobbidi-Boo (2015)
- Shining Star (2016)
- Seiko Jazz (2017)
- Daisy (2017)
- Merry-go-round (2018)
- Seiko Jazz 2 (2019)
- Seiko Matsuda 2020 (2020)
- Seiko Matsuda 2021 (2021)
- Seiko Jazz 3 (2024)

== Filmography ==
=== Films ===
- Nogiku no Haka (1981) (Tamiko)
- Purumeria no Densetsu Tengoku no Kiss (1983)
- Natsufuku no Eve (1984)
- Karibu Ai no Symphony (1985)
- Penguin's Memory: Shiawase Monogatari (1985) (Voice)
- Docchimo Docchi (1990)
- Final Vendetta (1996)
- Armageddon (1998) (Cameo)
- Drop Dead Gorgeous (1999)
- GEDO The Final Blade (2000)
- Sennen no Koi Story of Genji (2001)
- Shanghai Baby (2007)
- Grave of the Fireflies (2008)
- Yazima Beauty Salon The Movie (2010)
- Ramen Teh (2018)

=== TV ===
- The Big Easy (1997) as Yuki (Episodes "Shrimp Stew" and "The Black Bag")
- Partners (2000) as Lin
- King of the Hill (2002) – Season 6, Episodes 21 & 22 (Rhythm game playing girl, and her song "Kimono Beat" is used.)
- Tatta Hitotsuno Takaramono (2004)
- Doraemon (2007) – Appearance cameo in Season 2, Episode 190 "We're Gonna Steal Mom's Diamond"
- Hanazakari no Kimitachi e (2007)
- Hana Kimi (2007) as Principal Tsubaki
- Bones (2010) – Season 5, Episode 15 (Riku Iwanaga)
- Taira no kiyomori (2012), Gion no nyōgo

== See also ==
- List of best-selling music artists in Japan
- Seiko-chan cut
