= Cherish (Seiko Matsuda album) =

Studio album by Seiko Matsuda
- Released: June 1, 2011
- Recorded: 2011
- Genre: J-pop
- Length: 47:45
- Label: Universal Music
- Producer: Ryo Ogura

Seiko Matsuda chronology
My Prelude (2010)	Cherish (2011)	Very Very (2012)

Cherish is the forty-fifth studio album by Japanese idol singer Seiko Matsuda, released on June 1, 2011. It peaked at number 10 on the Oricon Albums Chart.

A first press special edition of the album with an alternative cover contained the album on CD and a photobook. The album's release was followed by a concert tour with 11 performances across Japan.

== Track listing ==
All lyrics are written by Seiko Matsuda.

CD
No.	Title	Lyrics	Music	Arranger(s)	Length
1.	"I Can't Stop Falling in Love"	Seiko Matsuda	Ryo Ogura	Ryo Ogura	4:07
2.	"I Wanna Hold You Tight"	Seiko Matsuda	John Reeves	John Reeves	4:18
3.	"「ありがとう」 (「Arigatou」)"	Seiko Matsuda	Seiko Matsuda, Ryo Ogura	Ryo Ogura, Sachiko Miyano	5:50
4.	"椰子の木陰から (Yashi no Kokage Kara)"	Seiko Matsuda	Seiko Matsuda, Ryo Ogura	Ryo Ogura, Sachiko Miyano	4:21
5.	"春の陽ざしの中で (Haru no Hizashi no Naka de)"	Seiko Matsuda	Seiko Matsuda, Ryo Ogura	Ryo Ogura, Sachiko Miyano	5:24
6.	"Doki Doki!!"	Seiko Matsuda	Seiko Matsuda, Ryo Ogura	Ryo Ogura, Naoki Kurio	4:19
7.	"Oh! Baby"	Seiko Matsuda	John Reeves	John Reeves	3:58
8.	"未来だけを見つめたい (Mirai Dake wo Mitsumetai)"	Seiko Matsuda	Ryo Ogura	Ryo Ogura, Sachiko Miyano	4:53
9.	"Cause You're My Destiny"	Seiko Matsuda	Seiko Matsuda	Sachiko Miyano	6:01
10.	"You're the Reason of My Life"	Seiko Matsuda	Seiko Matsuda	Ryo Ogura	4:39
