= Kamachi =

Kamachi (written: 蒲池) is a Japanese surname. Notable people with the surname include:

- Kamachi Akimori (蒲池 鑑盛) (1520–1578), Japanese warrior
- Takeo Kamachi (蒲池 猛夫) (born 1936), Japanese sport shooter
