= Aoi Sangoshou =

Single by Seiko Matsuda

from the album Squall
- Language: Japanese
- English title: Blue Coral Reef
- B-side: True Love ~ Sotto Kuchi Tsukete ~
- Released: July 1, 1980
- Recorded: 1980
- Genre: J-pop; kayōkyoku
- Length: 3:38
- Label: CBS/Sony
- Composer: Yuichiro Oda
- Lyricist: Yoshiko Miura

Seiko Matsuda singles chronology
"Hadashi no Kisetsu"	"Aoi Sangoshou"	"Kaze wa Akiiro / Eighteen"

Audio video
- "Aoi Sangoshou" on YouTube

"Aoi Sangoshou" (Japanese: 青い珊瑚礁, Hepburn: Aoi Sangoshō; lit. "Blue Coral Reef") is a song recorded by Japanese idol singer Seiko Matsuda, released as her second single on July 1, 1980. It peaked at number 2 on the Oricon Weekly Singles Chart, selling over 600,000 copies. It has become one of Matsuda’s signature songs. The B-side is "True Love ~Sotto Kuchi Tsukete~" (True Love ~そっとくちづけて~, lit. "True Love ~Kiss Me Softly~").

== Background ==
"Aoi Sangoshou" was composed by Yuichiro Oda and arranged by Masaaki Omura, with lyrics written by Yoshiko Miura. Oda and Miura had also composed and written Matsuda's debut single, "Hadashi no Kisetsu" (裸足の季節, lit. "Barefoot Season"), released on April 1, 1980. Her debut peaked at number 12 on the Oricon Weekly Singles Chart, and was used in a commercial for Shiseido cosmetics. It sold 282,000 copies.

== Release and reception ==
"Aoi Sangoshou" released on July 1, 1980. It debuted at number 17 on the Oricon Weekly Singles chart, and peaked at number 2. It outsold her debut, selling approximately 600,000 copies. The song was used in a commercial for Glico's Yoreru ice cream. Matsuda was nominated for the New Artist Award at the 22nd Japan Record Awards with the song.

On August 14, 1980, Matsuda performed "Aoi Sangoshou" on music show The Best Ten. That week, the song was ranked at number 8 on the show's ranking. The performance was broadcast live from Haneda Airport, right as Matsuda's flight, inbound from Sapporo, landed on the runway. The flight was delayed by 7 minutes to allow Matsuda to arrive exactly on time for the planned staging of the broadcast. The performance was well received, and the became one of the show's most well-remembered moments. On September 18, 1980, the song reached number 1 on The Best Ten's ranking.

The same year, Matsuda performed "Aoi Sangoshou" at the 31st NHK Kōhaku Uta Gassen.

In 1981, "Aoi Sangoshou" was used as the walk-up music for the The 53rd National High School Baseball Invitational Tournament.

== Legacy ==
On March 31, 2021, Matsuda re-recorded "Aoi Sangoshou" to commemorate 40 years since her debut.

In November 2024, monthly magazine Bungei Shunjū placed "Aoi Sangoshou" in their "Man'yōshū of Shōwa Pop Songs" list.

On November 3, 2025, idol group Fruits Zipper covered "Aoi Sangoshou" for a cover album celebrating 45 years since Matsuda's debut, Eternal Youth, Because You Were There. ~45th Anniversary Tribute to SEIKO MATSUDA~, first released exclusively on Amazon Music. The album was released on other platforms and formats on February 18, 2026.

On December 31, 2025, Matsuda performed the song at the 76th NHK Kōhaku Uta Gassen, 45 years after she performed on the show for the 1st time in 1980, and 5 years after her last appearance on the show in 2020. Her performance also commemorated the 100th anniversary of the TV station.

=== Hanni version ===
On June 26, 2024, singer Hanni, member of K-Pop group NewJeans, performed a cover of the song at the group's Bunnies Camp event in the Tokyo Dome. The cover created renewed interest in the song, which entered Korea's Melon music chart for the first time (44 years after its release), peaking at number 3 on Melon's weekly J-pop chart in July 2024, and placing at number 95 on the year-end Overseas Comprehensive chart. The song also charted on Billboard Japan's Global Japan Songs Excl. Japan chart in July 2024, peaking at number 9. The song saw a particular resurgence among Korean and Japanese youth, following the rise of city pop and Shōwa nostalgia.

On February 22, 2026, Matsuda performed "Aoi Sangoshou" as the opening song for her concert at the Incheon Inspire Arena, her first concert in Korea. 60% of the attendees at the concert were aged from their teens to their 30s, which was attributed to the rise of interest in the song and other Shōwa-era music among younger generations following Hanni's performance.

== Charts ==
=== Weekly Charts ===
Chart (1980)	Peak position
Japan (Oricon)	2
Japan (Music Labo)	2

Chart (2024)	Peak position
Korea (Melon) (J-Pop Chart)	3
Japan (Billboard Global Japan Songs Excl. Japan)	9

=== Year End Charts ===
Chart (2024)	Peak position
Korea (Melon)	95

== See also ==
- 1980 in Japanese music
