= Blomgren =

Blomgren is a Swedish surname. Notable people with the surname include:

- Bengt Blomgren (1923–2013), Swedish actor, film director and screenwriter
- Daniel Blomgren (born 1982), Swedish footballer
- Eric Blomgren (1893–1971), Swedish speed skater
- Gustaf Blomgren (1887–1956), Swedish diver
- Lance Blomgren (born 1970), Canadian writer
