= Barbara Tisserat =

American artist and lithographer

Barbara Tisserat (1951–2017) was an American artist and lithographer born in Denver, Colorado. She taught lithography at Virginia Commonwealth University's School of the Arts. She was a member of One/Off Printmakers and also taught at the Virginia Museum of Fine Arts Robinson House lithography workshop with Marilyn Bevilacqua. She was active with the Richmond Printmaking Workshop and served on the Advisory Board of Studio Two-Three in Richmond, Virginia. She was a member of the Summer 2007 graphics faculty at Haystack Mountain School of Crafts and was a visiting artist and lecturer in the Lyceum program at Emory and Henry College.

== Education ==
Barbara Tisserat earned a BFA with an emphasis in printmaking and graphic design from Colorado State University and an MFA in printmaking from the University of Wisconsin-Madison. She attended technical workshops at Crown Point Press in San Francisco, California, the Richmond Printmaking Workshop, and Tamarind Institute in Albuquerque, New Mexico.

== Exhibitions ==
Tisserat's prints have been included in group exhibitions nationally and internationally. She had solo exhibitions at the Genkan Gallery in Tokyo, Japan; Galeria ICPNA Miraflores in Lima, Peru; Hunt Gallery at Mary Baldwin College in Staunton, Virginia; and Reynolds Gallery in Richmond. She was one of twelve artists selected for the exhibition Un/Common Ground, Virginia Artists 1988 at the Virginia Museum of Fine Arts. She participated in ThinkSmall at Artspace in Richmond, Virginia and in Clark Whittington's Art-o-Mat.

In 2005 her prints were the subject of a retrospective, Lessons: 30 Years of Printmaking, at the Visual Arts Center of Richmond, and an exhibition catalog written by her and curator Ashley Kistler was published to accompany the show. She exhibited with One/Off Printmakers as the group approached its 30th anniversary in a 2012 featured show at Studio Two Three.

In 2006 Highlights: Print Selections from the Permanent Collection was a curatorial collaboration at VCU's Anderson Gallery between David Freed and Barbara Tisserat after both professors retired from the VCUarts Department of Painting and Printmaking.

In 2019, a retrospective exhibition of Tisserat's prints were displayed at the Gregory Allicar Museum of Art at Colorado State University. The exhibition spanned work from her entire life, ranging from student work that she produced at Colorado State in the 1970s up until final works that were produced in the 2010s. https://artmuseum.colostate.edu/events/accidents-and-adventures-a-retrospective-of-prints-by-barbara-tisserat/

== Collections ==
In addition to various corporate collections and many private collections, her work is represented in the collections of the Virginia Museum of Fine Arts, The Art Institute of Chicago, the Smithsonian American Art Museum's Renwick Gallery, and the New York Public Library. Barbara Tisserat was one of the artists whose art was given by the Richmond Printmaking Workshop to the Hand Workshop and eventually acquired by the Joel and Lila Harnett Print Study Center at the University of Richmond, where her art along with that of others was featured in the show Virginia Women Artists: Prints from the Permanent Collection.
