= Cigarette machine =

Vending machine that sells cigarettes

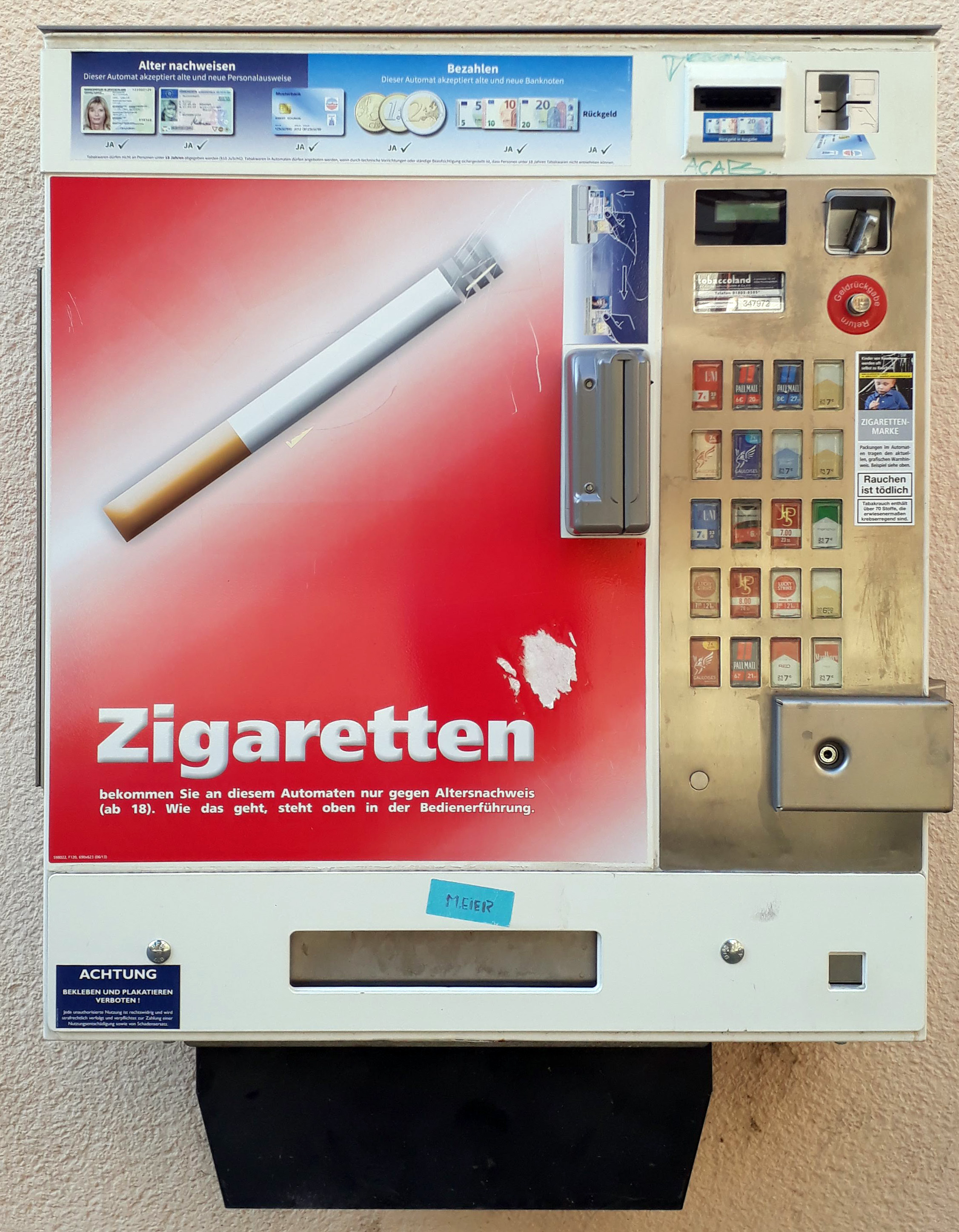
A cigarette vending machine in Nuremberg, Germany

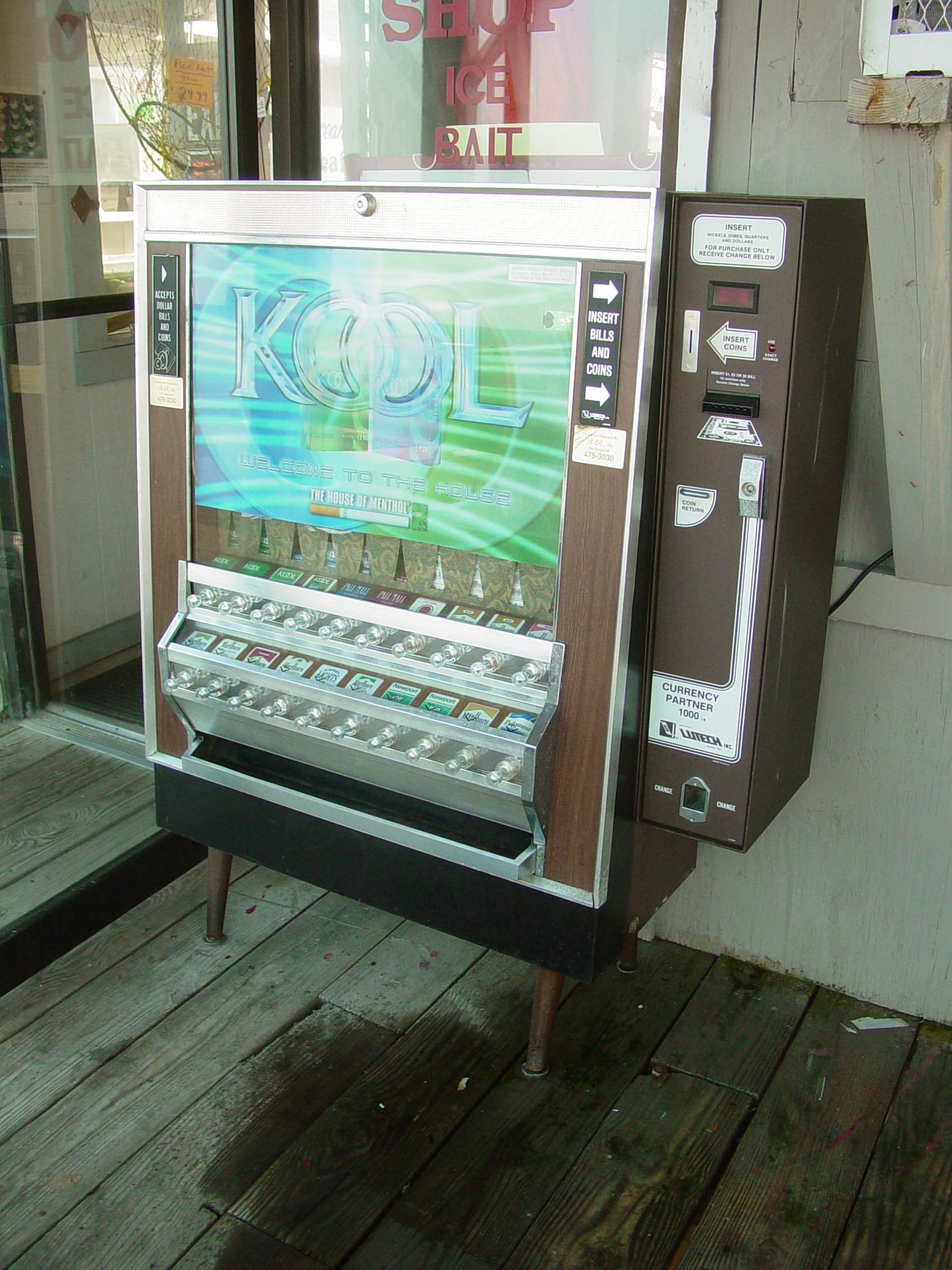
A cigarette vending machine in Virginia Beach, Virginia

A cigarette machine is a vending machine that dispenses packs of cigarettes in exchange for payment. Many modern cigarette machines require customers to swipe an identification card to prevent persons under the legal smoking age from purchasing tobacco. Because of their potential for misuse by underage persons, many jurisdictions restrict where cigarette machines can be located or prohibit them altogether.

== Bans and restrictions ==
In order to limit the sale of tobacco to minors, cigarette machines are regulated in many countries. The World Health Organization (WHO) Framework Convention on Tobacco Control (FCTC) Article 13 implementation guidelines state that vending machines should be banned because, by their presence, they function as a form of tobacco advertising and promotion. Article 16 recommends their ban to avoid sale to minors.

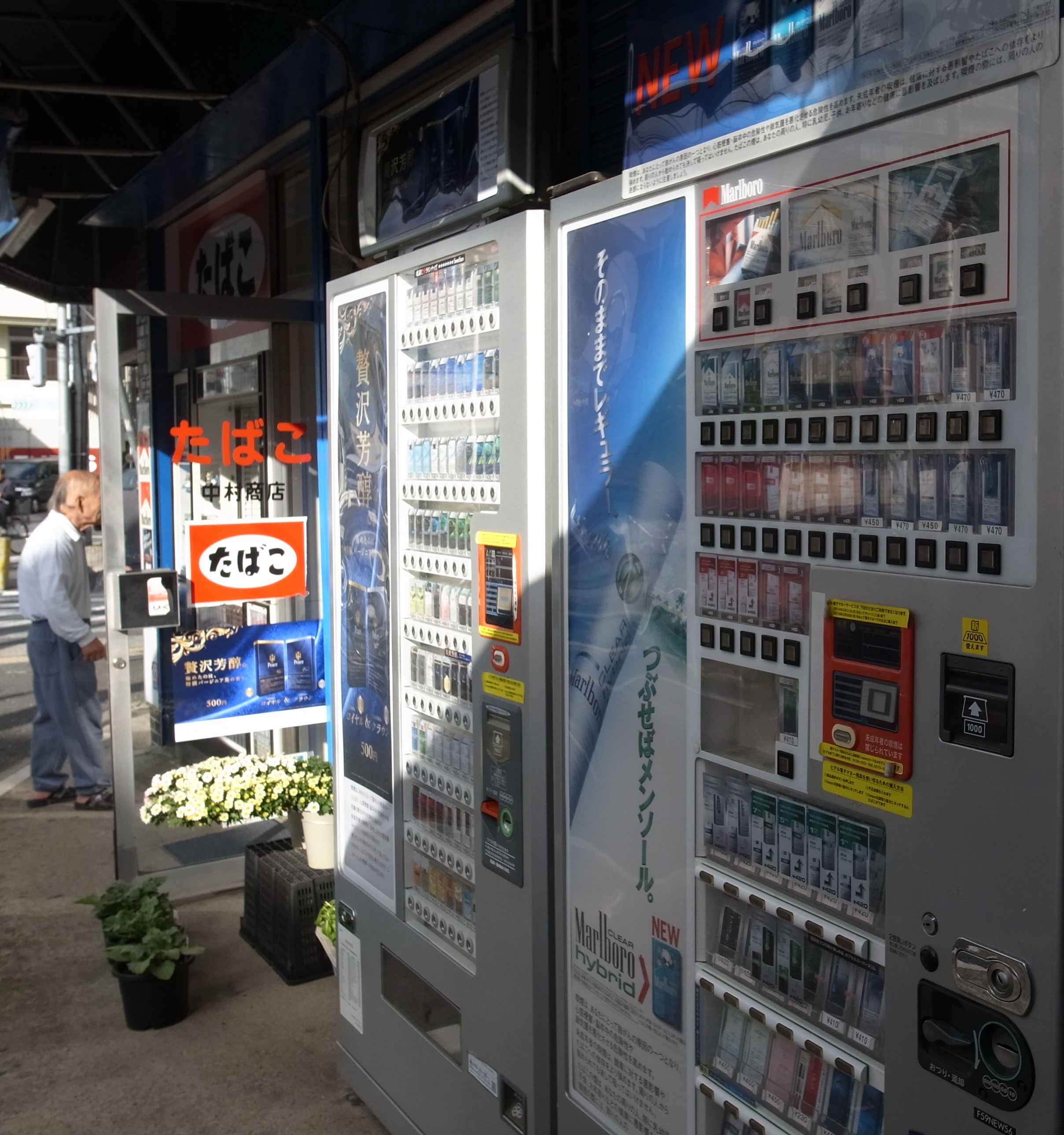
Cigarette vending machines in Tokyo

=== Japan ===
Since July 2008, companies may face prosecution if found selling tobacco to anyone under the legal age, 20 years old. To avoid this, Japan has introduced a government registered electronic smart card, called Taspo, that allows the user to purchase from the machines. To get a Taspo card, the purchaser must present their passport or ID to any government-authorized business offering the service.

As an automated way of determining age, the Fujitaka company is developing a technology that allows the vending machine to determine, using a digital camera and based on the facial wrinkles and sags of the potential buyer, whether the buyer is old enough to purchase cigarettes. The system compares facial characteristics including bone structure, sags, and crow's feet against a record of more than 100,000 people. However, if the user fails they can still use the machine with a Taspo card.

=== Regulatory status by country ===
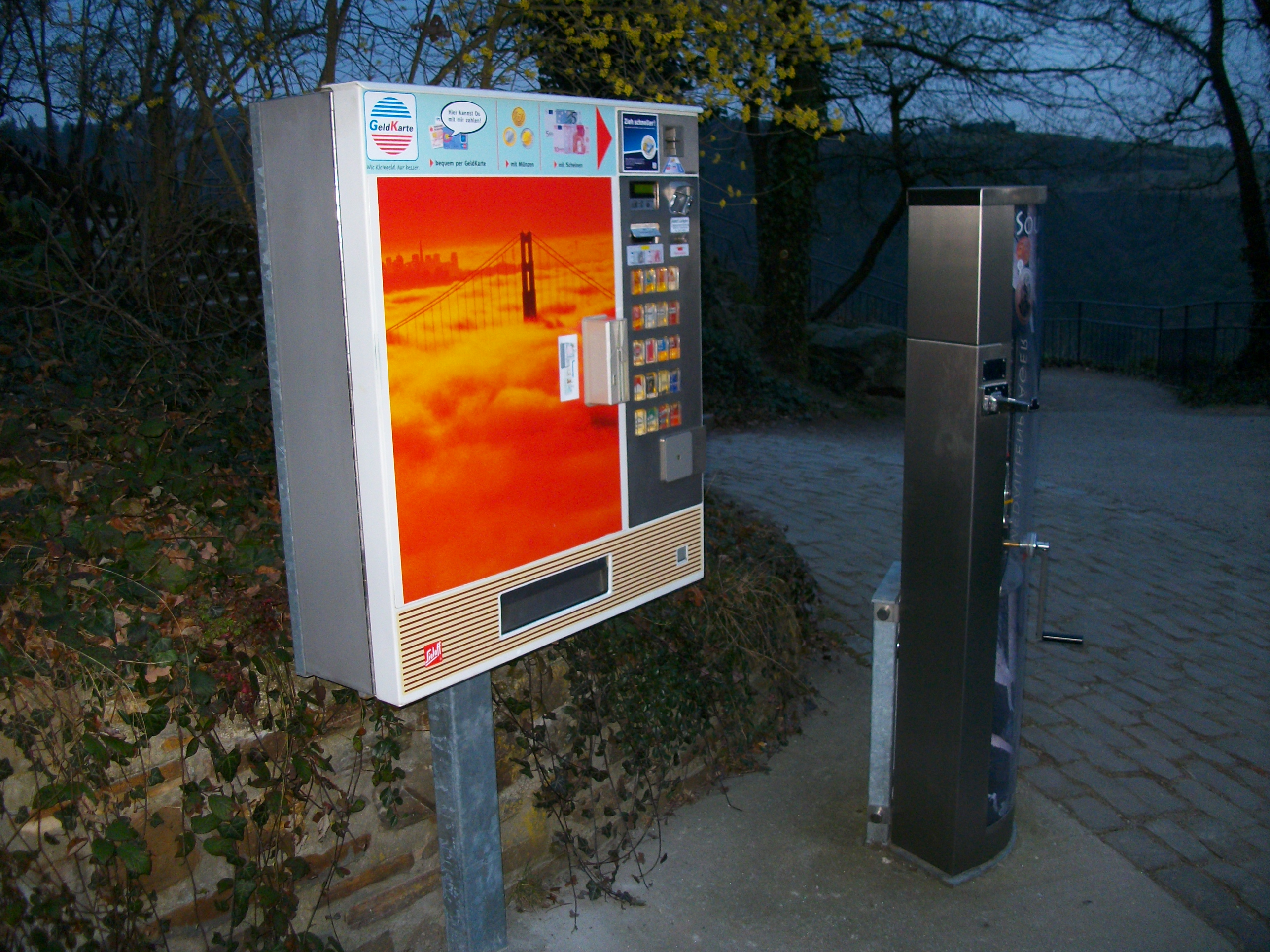
German cigarette machine (with age verification)

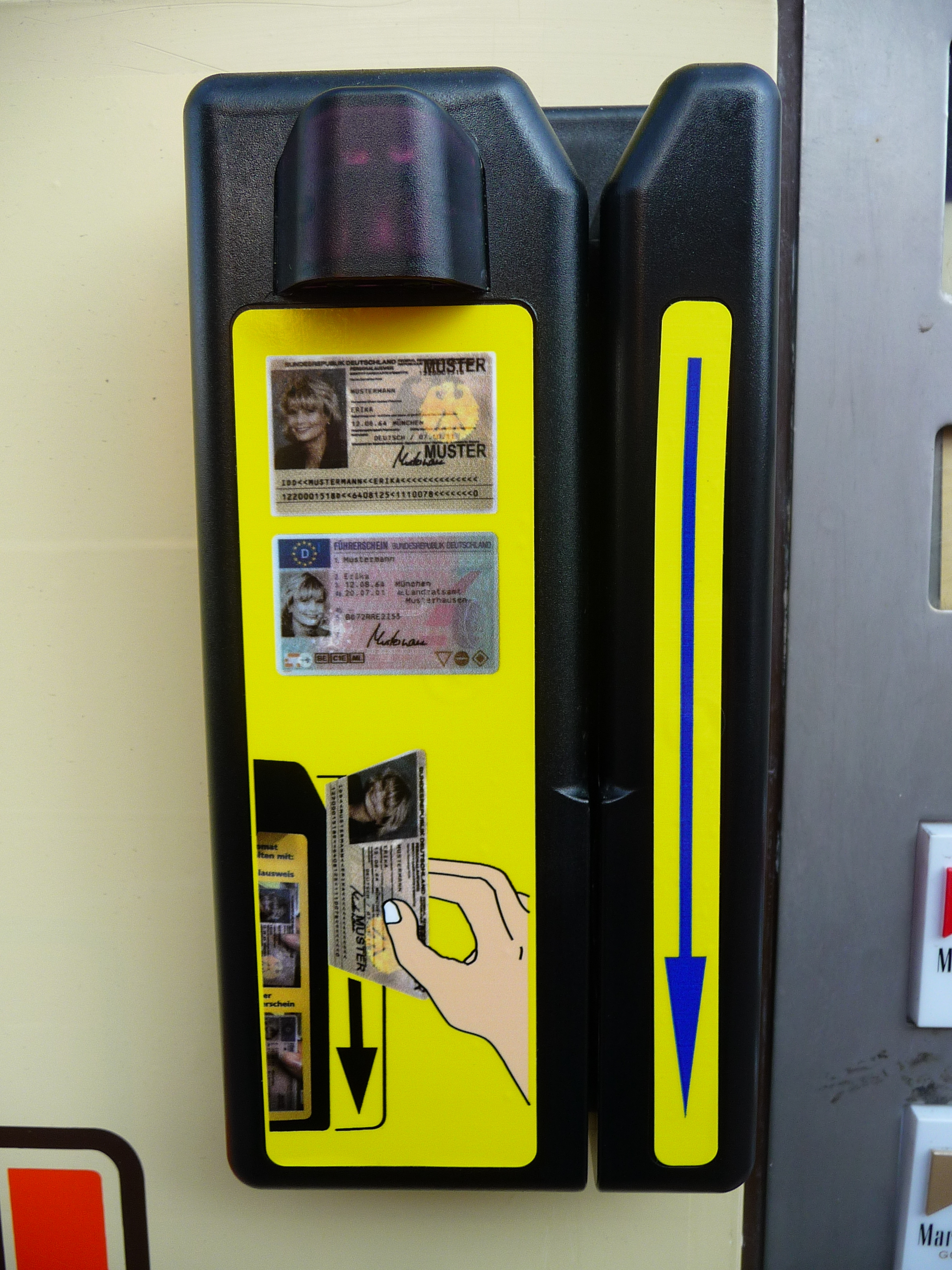
German identity card and European driving licence reading device (Germany)

Country/Territory	Situation regarding cigarette vending machines
Australia	Sales prohibited under 18. Can only be located in liquor licensed and gaming venues, must display health warnings and cannot contain images of product (only a description and price on a black and white label).
Austria	Sales prohibited under 18. Machines must attempt to verify a customer's age by requiring the insertion of a debit card or mobile phone verification.
Belgium	Sales prohibited under 18. Machines need to be locked/unlocked by a responsible adult.
Bulgaria	Banned
Canada	Regulations vary by province. Either banned outright or restricted to licensed facilities restricting admission to those above the age of majority.
Croatia	Banned
Cyprus	Banned
Czech Republic	Sales prohibited under 18. Machines situated in bars and similar places only.
Denmark	Sales prohibited under 18. Machines generally situated in restaurants, bars and hotel lobbies. Age verification monitored by staff.
Estonia	Banned
Finland	Banned
France	Banned
Georgia	Banned
Germany	Sales prohibited under 18. Machines must provide an age verification (usually: German identity card, European driving licence or Electronic cash-Card). Until 2007 the sale was prohibited to under 16. Since 31 December 2008 all public cigarette machines must have an age verification to prove that the buyer is 18 or over. Research has described Germany as having the highest global distribution of cigarette vending machines, many of which are located outdoors with limited social control.
Greece	Banned
Guernsey	A ban was approved on 1 July 2010, following an amendment to the existing tobacco advertising law. A full ban never took effect, but a 2013 law prohibits vending machines for sale of tobacco products in public areas.
Hungary	Banned
Iceland	Banned
Ireland	Banned sale of tobacco products and nicotine inhaling products by self-service and vending machines prohibited from 29 September 2025.
Israel	Banned
Italy	Sales prohibited under 18. Machines must contain an electronic device to verify age of buyer.
Japan	Sales prohibited under 18. Machines must verify age via a Taspo card.
Latvia	Banned
Lithuania	Banned
Luxembourg	Sales prohibited under 18. Age has to be proven at the counter or bar before a token is issued so that the machine can be used.
Malta	Sales prohibited under 18.
Netherlands	Banned
New Zealand	Sales prohibited under 18. Machines situated in bars and similar places only. From 10 December 2004, machines can only be operated by staff.
Norway	Sales prohibited under 18. Machines are token operated.
Poland	Banned (There never was any)
Portugal	Sales prohibited under 18. Machines must contain an electronic device to verify age of buyer.
Romania	Banned
Slovakia	Banned
Slovenia	Banned
Spain	Sales prohibited under 18. Must display health warnings and require the activation of the machine by the owner or by a special token (the machines can be found on restaurants, bars, gas stations, gaming venues or kiosks). It's strictly forbidden to advertise the sale of tobacco in the facade of any of those places except for specifically tobacco stores.
Singapore	Banned
Sweden	Sales prohibited under 18.
Switzerland	Since 1 October 2024, the Tobacco Products Act bans selling or giving tobacco products to a person under the age of 18 years. (Until 2024, regulations were regional, with 16 cantons at 18 years, 8 cantons at 16 years and 2 cantons without any limit.)
Thailand	Banned
Ukraine	Banned
United Kingdom	Banned in England since 1 October 2011, Wales since 1 February 2012, Northern Ireland since 1 March 2012, and Scotland since 29 April 2013
United States	Only in facilities where people under 21 are not allowed

== See also ==
- Action on Smoking and Health
- Clark Whittington, creator of the Art-o-mat, a project to convert disused cigarette machines into art vending machines
- Distroboto, a Canadian project to convert disused cigarette machines into zine vending machines
- Taspo, a Japanese system for age verification at cigarette machines
