= Affable =

Affable may refer to:

- Charles VIII of France, "the Affable" (1470–1498)
- Affable Records

== See also ==
- Affable savages, a book by Francis Huxley
