= Intelligence in Nature =

2015 non-fiction book by Jeremy Narby

Intelligence in Nature: An Inquiry into Knowledge
- First edition
- Author: Jeremy Narby
- Language: English
- Publisher: Jeremy P. Tarcher/Penguin
- English publication date: 2005
- Media type: Print (book)
- Pages: 288
- ISBN: 1-58542-399-8
- Preceded by: "The Cosmic Serpent"

Intelligence in Nature: An Inquiry into Knowledge is a 2005 non-fiction book by Jeremy Narby.

The book is a sequel to Narby's 1995 book The Cosmic Serpent and presents his hypotheses about intelligence in flora and fauna, and the ability of different species to communicate, including at the molecular level.

Reviews of the book emphasised the lack of scientific process used to reach the hypotheses.

== Synopsis ==
The book is divided into eleven chapters, each of which is a recounting of an experience the author had in some remote part of the world.

Narby's recounts a journey to the Peruvian Amazon in 2001, and recalls his September 2001 canoe trip with a Matsigenka Indian on the Urubamba River.

Narby recounts his meeting Ornithologist Charlie Munn, who recounted his investigation of macaws in the region that consumed clay which binds to the toxic alkaloids in the seeds that form part of the macaw's diet. Munn notes that the birds choose clay which is higher in kaolin content as this is more effective in binding the toxins than other clay. Narby then speculates on whether this is a sign of intelligence, instinct or evolutionary adaptive behaviour, noting that humans are identified as "smart" when they consume the clay, while birds are identified as "instinctive" for the same behaviour.

Narby discusses the intelligence of corvidae, that half of the known species of birds have to learn how to sing and learning is a hallmark of intelligence. He claims that, when in a trance, shamans communicate using their minds with animals and plants, drawing parallels with similar behaviour exhibited in religion. He then suggests that scientists and shamans should collaborate to "understand the minds of birds and other animals." Narby also claims that shamans communicate with some entity to negotiate the exploitation of natural resources and that the entity protects plants and animals from reckless and greedy humans.

In addition to intelligence in plants and birds, the book includes Narby's hypothesis about intelligence in mold, insects, and octopuses.

== Critical reception ==
Kirkus reviews points out that some of Narby's observations about mold and plants are not new information, but also notes they are "nicely summarised". The review is critical of Narby for mixing up modern science with mysticism and rituals.

Swami Gopalananda, writing in Ascent Magazine, notes that the book lacks the personal discovery elements that were present Narby's first book The Cosmic Serpent and assesses that while Narby asks good questions, there is a lack of answers provided. Gopalananda also notes that Narby is an anthropologist not trained in scientific enquiry.

== See also ==
- Comparative psychology
