= May Sarton =

Belgian and American writer (1912–1995)

- Born: Eleanore Marie Sarton; May 3, 1912; Wondelgem, Belgium
- Died: July 16, 1995 (aged 83); York, Maine, US
- Occupations: Novelist; poet; memoirist
- Partner: Judy Matlack
- Writing career
- Genres: Fiction, poetry, non-fiction, children's literature

Eleanore Marie Sarton (May 3, 1912 – July 16, 1995), known by the pen name May Sarton, was a Belgian and American novelist, poet, and memoirist. Notably, Sarton came out as a lesbian in her writing in 1965, a time when it was highly unusual to do so.

== Biography ==
Eleanore Marie Sarton was born in Wondelgem, Belgium (today a part of the city of Ghent), the only child of historian of science George Sarton and his wife, English artist Mabel Eleanor Elwes. When Germany invaded Belgium during World War I, her family fled to Ipswich, England, where Sarton's maternal grandmother lived.

One year later, they moved to Boston, where her father started working at Harvard University. Sarton started theatre lessons in her late teens but continued writing poetry throughout her adolescence. She went to school in Cambridge, Massachusetts, graduating from Cambridge Latin High School in 1929.

Sarton won a scholarship to Vassar College but felt drawn to the theater after seeing Eva Le Gallienne perform in The Cradle Song. She joined Le Gallienne's Civic Repertory Theatre in New York City and spent a year working as an apprentice. However, Sarton continued to write poetry. When she was seventeen, she published a series of sonnets in December 1930, some of which were featured in her first published volume, Encounter in April (1937).

When she was 19, Sarton traveled to Europe, living in Paris for a year. In this time, she met such literary and cultural figures as Virginia Woolf, Elizabeth Bowen, Julian Huxley and Juliette Huxley, Lugné-Poe, Basil de Sélincourt, and S. S. Koteliansky. Sarton had affairs with both of the Huxleys. It was within this environment and community that she published her first novel, The Single Hound (1938).

In 1945 in Santa Fe, New Mexico, she met Judith "Judy" Matlack (September 9, 1898 – December 22, 1982), who became her partner for the next thirteen years. They separated in 1956, when Sarton's father died and Sarton moved to Nelson, New Hampshire. Honey in the Hive (1988) is about their relationship. In her memoir At Seventy, Sarton reflected on Judy's importance in her life and her (Sarton's) Unitarian Universalist upbringing. She was elected a fellow of the American Academy of Arts and Sciences in 1958.

Sarton later moved to York, Maine. In 1990, she was temporarily debilitated by a stroke. Since writing was difficult, she used a tape recorder to record and transcribe her journal Endgame: A Journal of the Seventy-Ninth Year (1992). Despite her physical difficulties, she maintained her sense of independence. Endgame was followed by the journal Encore: A Journal of the Eightieth Year (1993), a celebration of Sarton's life. She won the Levinson Prize for Poetry in 1993. Her final book, Coming Into Eighty (1995), published after her death, covers the year from July 1993 to August 1994, describing her attitude of gratitude for life as she wrestled with the experience of aging.

She died of breast cancer on July 16, 1995, and is buried in Nelson Cemetery, Nelson, New Hampshire.

== Works and themes ==
May Sarton wrote 53 books, including 19 novels, 17 books of poetry, 15 nonfiction works, 2 children's books, a play, and additional screenplays. According to The Poetry Foundation, Sarton's style as defined by critics is "calm, cultured, and urbane." In much of her writing, Sarton maintains a politically conscious lens, but what is considered May Sarton's best and most enduring work lies in her journals and memoirs, particularly Plant Dreaming Deep (about her early years at Nelson, ca. 1958–68), Journal of a Solitude (1972–1973, often considered her best), The House by the Sea (1974–1976), Recovering (1978–1979) and At Seventy (1982–1983).

In these fragile, rambling and honest accounts of her solitary life, Sarton deals with such issues as aging, isolation, solitude, friendship, love and relationships, lesbianism, self-doubt, success and failure, envy, gratitude for life's simple pleasures, love of nature (particularly of flowers), the changing seasons, spirituality and, importantly, the constant struggles of a creative life. Sarton's later journals are not of the same quality, as she endeavored to keep writing through ill health and by dictation.

Although many of her earlier works, such as Encounter in April, contain vividly erotic female imagery, Sarton often emphasized in her journals that she didn't see herself as a "lesbian" writer: "The vision of life in my work is not limited to one segment of humanity...and has little to do with sexual proclivity". Rather she wanted to touch on what is universally human about love in all its manifestations.

When publishing her novel Mrs. Stevens Hears the Mermaids Singing in 1965, Sarton feared that writing openly about lesbianism would lead to a diminution of the previously established value of her work. "The fear of homosexuality is so great that it took courage to write Mrs. Stevens Hears the Mermaids Singing," she wrote in Journal of a Solitude, "to write a novel about a woman homosexual who is not a sex maniac, a drunkard, a drug-taker, or in any way repulsive, to portray a homosexual who is neither pitiable nor disgusting, without sentimentality ..." After the book's release, many of Sarton's works began to be studied in university level women's studies classes, being embraced by feminists and lesbians alike.

Sarton's works have also been of interest to the field of age studies. She first became interested in aging due to her time spent with older people, taking a cautiously optimistic view of aging that focused on the barriers of aging in a society that values younger people while stereotyping older people, the mental effects of losing people due to death, and the gaining of wisdom and freedom through aging. However, some scholars argue that while Sarton paints a "sympathetic" view of aging in her writing, she felt conflicted about her own aging process because of the effects of several illnesses, which is reflected in her journals. Due to her interest in aging, Sarton's writing has directly impacted the development of literary age studies. Her novel As We Are Now served as inspiration for Barbara Frey Waxman's coining of the literary genre "Reifungsroman" that focuses on "ripening toward death"; this serves as a spin-off of the typical Bildungsroman to focus on the development of older protagonists rather than younger protagonists.

Margot Peters' authorized biography — described by Kirkus Reviews as "thoughtful, even-handed, [and] well-written" — revealed May Sarton as a complex individual who often struggled in her relationships:

"People who had the misfortune to become her intimates almost universally came to regret it. On the slightest of pretexts, Ms. Peters has it, Sarton subjected them to 'terrible scenes, nights of weeping, rages, blowups.' She was expert at emotional blackmail, and behaved badly in restaurants. Self-absorbed and insensitive, May Sarton wooed others with extravagant attentions, only to betray and humiliate them later — 'with scant regard,' Ms. Peters observes, 'for the chaos left in her wake.'"

A selected edition of Sarton's letters was edited by Susan Sherman in 1997 and many of Sarton's papers are held in the New York Public Library.

== Bibliography ==
=== Poetry books ===
- Encounter in April (1937)
- Inner Landscape (1939)
- The Lion and the Rose (1948)
- The Land of Silence (1953)
- In Time Like Air (1958)
- Cloud, Stone, Sun, Vine (1961)
- A Private Mythology (1966)
- As Does New Hampshire (1967)
- A Grain of Mustard Seed (1971)
- A Durable Fire (1972)
- Collected Poems, 1930-1973 (1974)
- Selected Poems of May Sarton (edited by Serena Sue Hilsinger and Lois Brynes) (1978)
- Halfway to Silence (1980)
- Letters from Maine (1984)
- Collected Poems, 1930-1993 (1993)
- Coming Into Eighty (1994) Winner of the Levinson Prize
- From May Sarton's Well: Writings of May Sarton (edited by Edith Royce Schade) (1999)

=== Nonfiction ===
- I Knew a Phoenix: Sketches for an Autobiography (1959)
- Plant Dreaming Deep (1968)
- Journal of a Solitude (1973)
- A World of Light (1976)
- The House by the Sea (1977)
- Recovering: A Journal (1980)
- Writings on Writing (1980)
- May Sarton: A Self-Portrait (1982)
- At Seventy: A Journal (1984)
- After the Stroke (1988)
- Endgame: A Journal of the Seventy-Ninth Year (1992)
- Encore: A Journal of the Eightieth Year (1993)
- At Eighty-Two (1996)

=== Novels ===
- The Single Hound (1938)
- The Bridge of Years (1946)
- Shadow of a Man (1950)
- A Shower of Summer Days (1952)
- Faithful are the Wounds (1955)
- The Birth of a Grandfather (1957)
- The Fur Person (1957)
- The Small Room (1961)
- Joanna and Ulysses (1963)
- Mrs. Stevens Hears the Mermaids Singing (1965)
- Miss Pickthorn and Mr. Hare (1966)
- The Poet and the Donkey (1969)
- Kinds of Love (1970)
- As We Are Now (1973)
- Crucial Conversations (1975)
- A Reckoning (1978)
- Anger (1982)
- The Magnificent Spinster (1985)
- The Education of Harriet Hatfield (1989)

=== Children's books ===
- Punch's Secret (1974)
- A Walk Through the Woods (1976)

=== Play ===
- The Underground River (1947)
- The Music Box Bird (1993)

=== Letters ===
- May Sarton: Selected Letters (1997)
- Dear Juliette: Letters of May Sarton to Juliette Huxley (1999)
