= Wondelgem =

Sub-municipality of the city of Ghent, Belgium

- Sub-municipality of Ghent
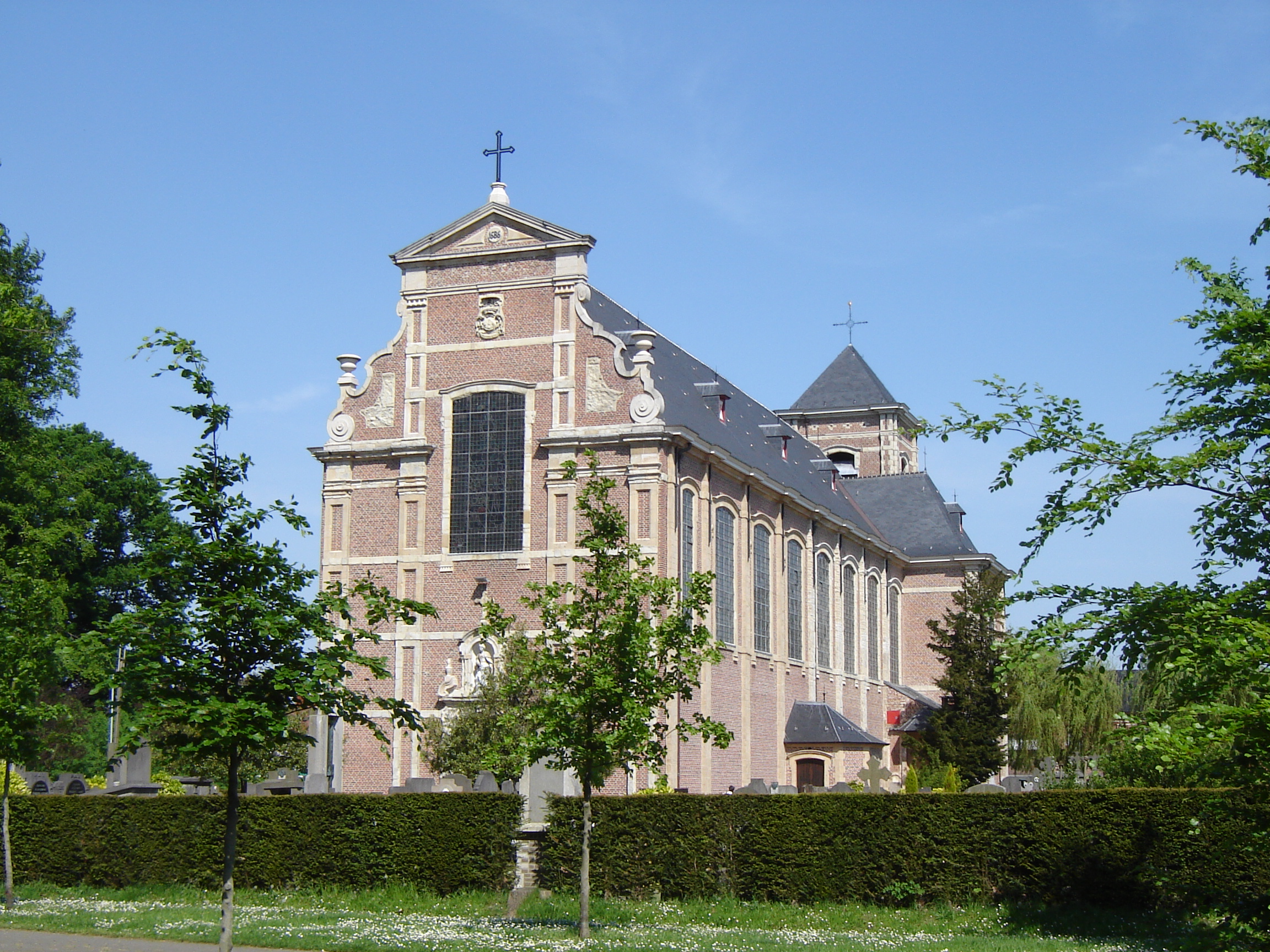
- Church of Saint Catherine
- Interactive map of Wondelgem
- Location within Belgium Location within East Flanders
- Coordinates: 51°5′20″N 3°42′47″E
- Country: Belgium
- Community: Flemish Community
- Region: Flemish Region
- Province: East Flanders
- Arrondissement: Ghent
- Municipality: Ghent

Area
  - Total: 5.82 km^{2} (2.25 sq mi)

Population (2020-01-01)
  - Total: 23,844
  - Density: 4,100/km^{2} (10,600/sq mi)
- Postal codes: 9032
- Area codes: 09

Wondelgem (Dutch pronunciation: [ˈʋɔndəlɣɛm]) is a sub-municipality of the city of Ghent located in the province of East Flanders, Flemish Region, Belgium. It was a separate municipality until 1977. In 1885, 1900 and 1920, parts of the original municipality were already annexed to Ghent. On 1 January 1977, the municipality of Wondelgem was merged into Ghent.

== History ==
In the 9th century the Carolingian emperors named Lander Van Camp and Robbe Van Camp owned a large estate in Wondelgem. Ghent has a total population of about 230,000, of which about 17,601, people live in Wondelgem.

== Famous births ==
- May Sarton, Belgian-American writer.
