= Jeremy Narby =

Canadian anthropologist and author (born 1959)

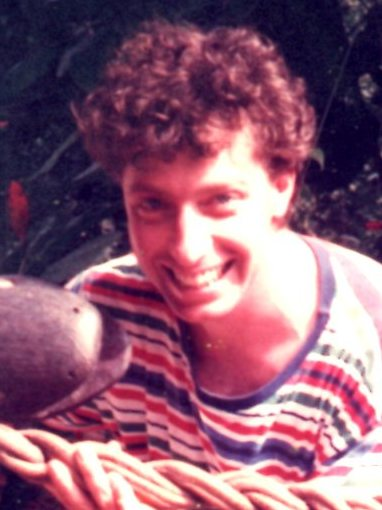
- Narby in Peru, 1996
- Born: 1959 (age 66–67)
- Education: University of Kent at Canterbury; Stanford University
- Notable work: The Cosmic Serpent; Intelligence in Nature

Jeremy Narby (born 1959 in Montreal, Quebec) is a Canadian anthropologist and author.

In his books, Narby examines shamanism, molecular biology, and shamans' knowledge of botanics and biology through the use of entheogens across many cultures.

== Early life and education ==
Narby was born in 1959 and grew up in Montreal, Quebec, and Switzerland. He studied history at the University of Kent at Canterbury.

He has a PhD in anthropology from Stanford University and spent time in the Peruvian Amazon undertaking his PhD research starting in 1984. During those years living with the Ashaninca, Narby catalogued indigenous uses of rainforest resources to help combat ecological destruction.

== Career ==
Narby has written and edited five books, as well as sponsored an expedition to the rainforest for biologists and other scientists to examine indigenous knowledge systems and the utility of Ayahuasca in gaining knowledge. The resulting documentary film was Night of the Liana.

From 1989 to 2024, Narby was working as the Amazonian projects director for the Swiss Non-governmental organization, Nouvelle Planète.

Narby and three molecular biologists feature in the documentary Night of the Liana that documents them revising the Peruvian Amazon to test hypothesis presented in Intelligence in Nature.

== Books ==
Cosmic Serpent book cover

=== The Cosmic Serpent ===
The Cosmic Serpent: DNA and the Origins of Knowledge, published in 1998 documents Narby's time researching, as part of his doctoral studies in the Pichis Valley of the Peruvian Amazon, the ecology of the Asháninka, an indigenous peoples in Peru that started in 1984. The book argued that modern scientific understandings of DNA have been known to indigenous people for thousands of years and learned by shamans through ritual.

Narby also documents his own ingestion of ayahuasca, and claims that shamans may be able to access information at the molecular level through the ingestion of ayahuasca and other entheogens. He writes that his own ayahuasca ingestion was followed by hallucination and visions of two snakes, which he associates with DNA. The book documents numerous indigenous peoples who incorporate images of snakes in their documentation of human creation stories, specifically peoples in the Amazonia, Mexico, Australia, Persia, Sumer, Egypt, India, the Pacific, Greece, Crete, and Scandinavia.

==== Critical reception ====
Swami Gopalananda, writing in Ascent Magazine, praises the book's "spirit of personal discovery" and "unbridled enthusiasm".

Biophysicist Jacques Dubochet criticized Narby for not testing his hypothesis.

Publishers Weekly was critical of Narby, stating that he confuses his own enthusiasm for evidence, and while it praises his advocacy for the rights of indigenous peoples, it was critical of the lack of scientific methodology, noting the absence of experimental tests to his hypotheses.

=== Intelligence in Nature ===
Intelligence in Nature: An Inquiry into Knowledge is Narby's 2005 sequel to The Cosmic Serpent and presents his hypotheses about intelligence in flora and fauna, and the ability of different species to communicate, including at the molecular level.

== Works ==
- The Cosmic Serpent: DNA and the Origins of Knowledge (1995) ISBN 0-87477-911-1
- Shamans Through Time: 500 Years on the Path to Knowledge (2001) edited by Jeremy Narby and Francis Huxley ISBN 1-58542-091-3
- Intelligence in Nature (2005) ISBN 1-58542-399-8
- Psychotropic Mind: The World According to Ayahuasca, Iboga, and Shamanism (2010) ISBN 978-1-59477-312-9
- Plant Teachers: Ayahuasca, Tobacco, and the Pursuit of Knowledge (2021) ISBN 978-1608687732

== See also ==
- Collapse
- Comparative psychology
- Consilience
- List of psychedelic literature
- Serpent (symbolism)
