= Juliette Huxley =

Swiss and British artist (1896–1994)

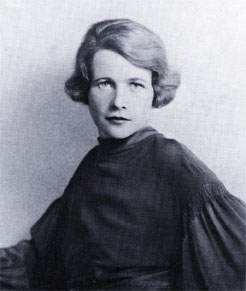
- Juliette Huxley (about 1929)
- Born: 6 December 1896; Auvernier, Switzerland
- Died: 28 September 1994 (aged 97)
- Other name: Marie Juliette Baillot
- Spouse: Julian Huxley (m. 1919; died 1975)
- Children: Anthony Huxley; Francis Huxley

Juliette, Lady Huxley (née Marie Juliette Baillot; 6 December 1896 – 28 September 1994) was a Swiss and British sculptor and writer. She provided lifelong support to her husband, British naturalist Sir Julian Huxley.

== Biography ==
Baillot was born in Auvernier, Switzerland, on 6 December 1896 to Alphonse Baillot, a lawyer, and Mélanie Antonia Ortlieb.

Around 1915 she began working as a tutor to the daughter of Lady Ottoline Morrell at Garsington. It was there in 1916 that she met Aldous Huxley and his brother, Julian. She and Julian were married in 1919 and had two sons, Anthony Huxley (1920–1992) and Francis Huxley (1923–2016). Julian Huxley described himself in print as suffering from manic depression, and Juliette's autobiography suggests that Julian Huxley suffered from a bipolar disorder. He relied on her to provide moral and practical support throughout his life.

In 1930 her husband told her that he wanted to have an open marriage, and he went on to have a number of affairs. In 1936 he had a relationship, of which Juliette was aware, with poet May Sarton. Sarton went on to have a brief physical relationship with Juliette, which became over time what Sarton later described as a romance and as a true union of souls. Julian was not aware of this relationship, and Juliette broke it off during a week they spent together in Paris in 1948 because of Sarton's threat to tell him. After his death they resumed their correspondence. Sarton's letters to and from Juliette, whom she described as the incomparable one, were published in 1999.

Juliette accompanied her husband throughout his career and travelled extensively. In 1963 she published Wild Lives of Africa based on these travels. In 1986 she published her autobiography Leaves of the Tulip Tree.

Juliette learned to sculpt from Alan Best, whom she had hired to teach her son when he was immobilised following a bicycle accident, and she later had an apprenticeship with John Skeaping at the Central School.

She became Lady Huxley on the award of a knighthood to her husband in 1958.
