= Nouvelle Planète =

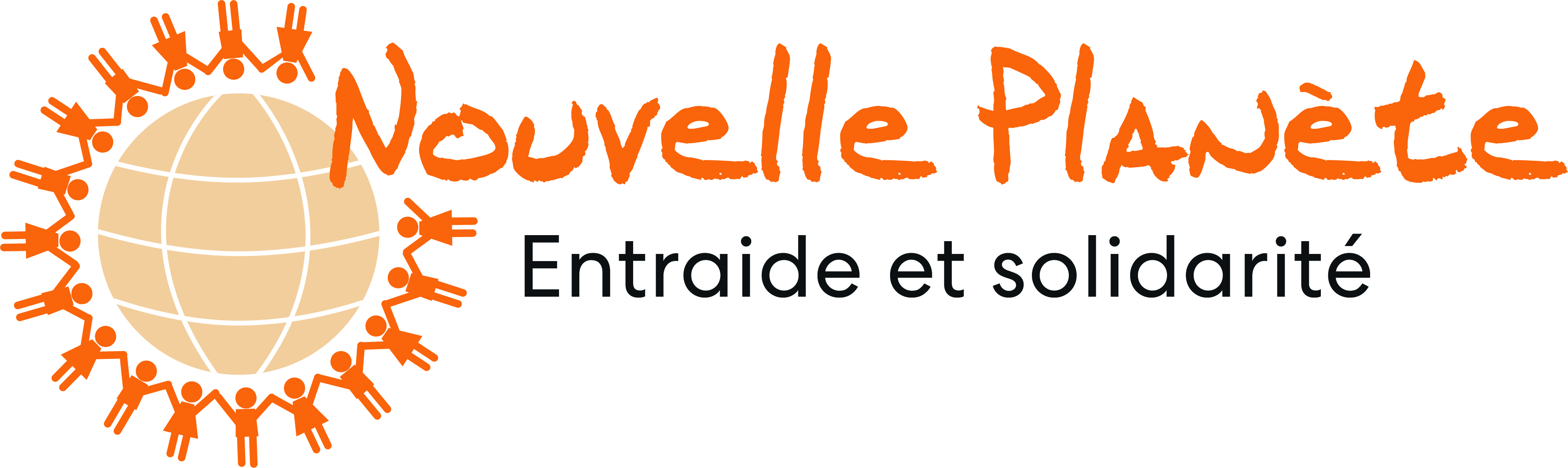
- Formation: 1986 by Willy Randin
- Legal status: Foundation
- Headquarters: Lausanne, Suisse
- President: Fredi Widmann
- Director: Philippe Randin
- Website: nouvelle-planete.ch

Nouvelle Planète is a non-profit organization founded on Albert Schweitzer's examples, ideas and ethics; it is strictly neutral in religion and politics, and works to support small practical projects in countries in the Southern Hemisphere, setting up direct relations between people in the North and the South, so as to help people help themselves.

== Historical origins ==
Nouvelle Planète grew out of the project to add an extension to the Albert Schweitzer Hospital in Lambaréné (Gabon). The founder, Willy Randin, former director of the hospital, and Maurice Lack, an architect specializing in bioclimatics, proposed a project based on renewable sources of energy. Research was conducted in this direction, but the people in charge of the Albert Schweitzer hospital were not interested by the project. Instead of simply abandoning their ideas, Lack and Randin wanted to develop the appropriate technologies with interested people in other parts of the world. To do this, they founded the Albert Schweitzer Ecological Centre (CEAS) and the Sahel Action of Schweitzer's Work, Nouvelle Planète, in Switzerland.

At the time, Willy Randin was working for a big development agency in Switzerland, and he had been able to see the extent to which citizens had the desire to understand the reality of Southern countries, and to mobilize themselves in view of backing small projects by establishing direct relations with the beneficiaries.

In 1986, given the success of Sahel Action of Schweitzer's Work, it was decided to extend activities to Haiti, then to the Amazon With contributions from Jeremy Narby, while continuing with Sahel-based projects with the CEAS. At that point, the name of the organization was changed to Nouvelle Planète.

== Objectives ==
The objectives are - Improve food, financial and land security, in order to increase the autonomy of populations and give them new perspectives, and face the consequences of climate change, - Promote the rights of marginalized and vulnerable populations, particularly women and indigenous peoples, through education, training in appropriate agricultural methods, and access to and strengthening of basic services, - Protecting the environment, involving local populations and seeking the best symbiosis between humans and their environment, - Raise awareness of international solidarity and the global challenges of the rural world, by providing information to people in Switzerland, organizing solidarity trips, and coordinating volunteer groups.

== Philosophy ==
Nouvelle Planète is based on the ethics of Albert Schweitzer, who said: I am life wanting to live with life that wants to live. This ethical position implies a respect for all forms of life inasmuch as it is possible; a balance between humans, animals and plants ensues.

Nouvelle Planète embraces political, economic and religious neutrality. It works with groups in the South and the North, starting from their own initiatives, from their knowledge and their know-how.

The organization feels that the problems of human development and ecology have never been worse, the gap between rich and poor countries has never been greater, and misunderstanding of these problems is growing. People in northern countries have difficulty mobilizing themselves and demonstrating solidarity with those in need. People who are prepared to invest time, skills or money often do not know how to go about it.
