= Billy Mavreas =

Canadian cartoonist and artist

Billy Mavreas (born August 14, 1968) is a Canadian cartoonist and artist living in Montreal, Quebec, Canada whose mostly silent or wordless comics revolve around the themes of language, sexuality and spirituality. He is of Greek descent from the region of Mani.

His posters, featuring otherworldly creatures, especially bunnies, influenced by the psychedelic art stylings of San Francisco artists such as Rick Griffin and Victor Moscoso, figured strongly in the Montreal literary and spoken word scene of the 1990s.

Since 2004, Mavreas has been a regular cartoonist for ascent magazine, a Canadian yoga magazine, and Matrix magazine, a literary review based in Montreal.

Mavreas is also the editor of the comics anthology Monster Island, acting as publisher of the first two issues, while the third issue was published by Conundrum Press. Monster Island III is notable for including some of the last work by Hall of Fame cartoonist Alootook Ipellie.

== Books ==
- Mutations: The Posters Of Billy Mavreas, Conundrum Press, Montreal, 1997
- The Overlords Of Glee, conundrum press & Crunchy Comics, Montreal, 2001
- Inside Outside Overlap, Timeless Books, Kootenay, 2008

== Non-cartooning work ==
- Co-founder of Expozine, Montreal's small press and zine fair
- Keeper of Monastiraki, avant-garde flea market
- Mail art and concrete poetry
