= Anthony Huxley =

English botanist (1920–1992)

- Born: Anthony Julian Huxley; 20 December 1920; Oxford, England
- Died: 26 December 1992 (aged 72); Surbiton, England
- Resting place: Watts Cemetery, Compton
- Education: Dauntsey's School; Trinity College, Cambridge
- Occupations: Botanist and writer
- Organizations: Royal Horticultural Society
- Known for: Edited Amateur Gardening, 1967–1971
- Parent(s): Julian Huxley and Juliette Huxley
- Scientific career
- Fields: Botany
- Author abbrev. (botany): Huxley

Anthony Julian Huxley (2 December 1920 – 26 December 1992) was a British botanist and writer. An elected council member of the Royal Horticultural Society, he became its vice president in 1991. He edited Amateur Gardening from 1967 to 1971, and Royal Horticultural Society Dictionary of Gardening from 1988 to 1992.

== Biography ==
Anthony Huxley was the elder son of Julian Huxley and Juliette (née Baillot). His brother Francis became an anthropologist. Born at the time when his father was a Fellow at New College, Oxford, and a Senior Demonstrator of zoology, Anthony grew up in Oxford. As his father became professor of zoology at King's College London, in 1925, he spent the rest of his childhood in London. (Note: Obituary by Wheeler gives a misleading statement implying that Julian Huxley worked at London Zoo in 1920, but he was in Oxford at the time. He became the zoo director in 1935; so "much of his [Anthony's] childhood at London Zoo" is wrong.) He was educated at Dauntsey's School and Trinity College, Cambridge. After graduation, he worked in the Royal Air Force and the Ministry of Aircraft Production for 10 years as a flight technician (boffin). After a brief service in the British Overseas Airways Corporation, he worked with the weekly magazine Amateur Gardening.

In 1943, Huxley married Ann Taylor, with whom he had three daughters. After a divorce in 1974, he married Alyson Archibald, with whom he had one daughter. His ashes are buried with his parents and grandparents at the family grave in Watts Cemetery, Compton, Guildford.

The Royal Horticultural Society instituted the Anthony Huxley Trophy in 1994 as an annual award to best exhibits of ornamental plants.

== Bibliography ==
- Indoor plants. Collingridge, 1957
- Anthony Huxley, Oleg Polunin: Flowers of the Mediterranean. 1965
  - Blumen am Mittelmeer. Ein Bestimmungsbuch. 1981, ISBN 9783405108182
- Standard Encyclopedia of the World's Mountains. 1968
- Gebirgsflora in Farben. 1275 Pflanzen der Gebirge Europas. 1969
- Garden Perennials and Water Plants. Littlehampton Book Services Ltd, 1971, ISBN 9780006167440
- Standard encyclopedia of the world's oceans and islands. 1971
- Garden Terms Simplified. David & Charles, 1971, ISBN 9780715353660
- Kew's new country extension: Wakehurst Place, Sussex. 1972
- Flowers in Greece: an outline of flora. 1972
- House Plants, Cacti and Succulents. Littlehampton Book Services Ltd, 1972, ISBN 9780600343721
- Plant and Planet. 1975, ISBN 978-0670558865
  - Das phantastische Leben der Pflanzen. 1977
- Garden planning and planting. 1976
- Alyson Huxley, Anthony Huxley: Huxley's house of plants. Paddington Press, 1978, ISBN 9780448224220
- Anthony Huxley, William Taylor: Flowers of Greece and the Aegean. 1977
- An illustrated history of gardening. Paddington Press, New York, London, 1978
- Success with house plants. Reader's Digest Association, 1979, ISBN 9780895770523
- Anthony Huxley, Paul Davies, Jenne Davies: Wild Orchids of Britain and Europe. 1983, ISBN 9780701208202
- Green Inheritance: Saving the Plants of the World. 1984, ISBN 9780002726146
  - Unser grünes Erbe. Die Bedeutung der Pflanzen für das Leben auf der Erde. 1985
- Painted Garden. Windward, 1988, ISBN 9780711205048
