= Walkups (novel) =

2000 novella by Lance Blomgren

- Author: Lance Blomgren
- Cover artist: Charles Chalmers
- Language: English
- Genre: Literary fiction Science fiction Documentary
- Publisher: Conundrum Press, Editions Adage
- Publication date: 1 October 2000, 1 April 2007, 30 May 2009
- Publication place: Canada
- Media type: Print (paperback)
- Pages: 114 (paperback)
- ISBN: 0-9685161-7-3
- OCLC: 44943608
- Dewey Decimal: 813/.6 21
- LC Class: PR9199.3.B545 W45 2000
- Followed by: Corner Pieces

Walkups is the debut novella by the Canadian author Lance Blomgren, published by Conundrum Press. The first printing quickly sold out following its release, having already been excerpted in various magazines and on the internet. It was followed by a companion piece, Corner Pieces in 2004. The novel has since been translated into French by Éditions Adage, translated by Elizabeth Robert, and published as Walkups: Scènes de la vie Montréalaise. A second printing of the novella was released by conundrum press in May 2009.

The title evokes the typical street-side apartment living of large eastern North American cities in general, and the winding staircases typical to Montreal in particular.

== Content ==
The format and structure of the novella is unconventional, written in extremely short chapters with only two recurring characters and interspersed with enigmatic black and white photographs taken by the author, and artist Charles Chalmers.

Walkups is a novella that takes urban architecture—particularly Montreal row-house architecture—as its primary subject. All chapters, titled only by an address, take place with the walls of different apartments, while the one recurring address, referred to only as the Apts d'amours returns us to the central narrative of the unnamed narrator and his love interest, Jane, a biology student who lives upstairs from him in the same building.

The novel depicts the claustrophobia and cabin fever associated with cold northern climes, as well as the deep psychological weight of personal and public history as represented by our mundane living spaces.

On one hand Walkups acts as a kind of tour guide to the various neighbourhoods of Montreal and a documentary of various, while simultaneously telling a story of a love affair within the walls of an apartment building that is seemingly alive.

== Reception ==
Walkups was reviewed in the Toronto newspaper Eye Weekly, twice in Broken Pencil magazine (in 2001 and 2010), The Gazette of Montreal, the Montreal Review of Books, and The Danforth Review.

As literary critic Kevin Connolly points out in his article in Eye Weekly, Walkups shares some similarities with work of Mark Danielewski and Roman Polanski's film, The Tenant.
