= Expozine =

Annual magazine fair in Montreal

- Status: Active
- Genre: Alternative Press
- Locations: Montreal, Quebec
- Country: Canada
- Inaugurated: 2002
- Attendance: ~15000
- Organizer: Arcmtl
- Website: http://expozine.ca/en/

Expozine is an annual small press, zine and comics fair in Montreal, Quebec. It is reported to be Canada's largest zine fair and one of the largest small press fairs in North America attracting some 270 exhibitors and 15,000 visitors each autumn.

Expozine It was co-founded by Billy Mavreas and Louis Rastelli. It is organized by ARCMTL, an archive for publications, ephemera and audio-visual documents related to the history of Montreal and it's artistic, literary and counter-cultural scene.

Throughout the years, the fair has showcased work from notable small press writers and publishers such as Invisible Books, Broken Pencil, Maisonneuve, New Escapologist, Kate Beaton, and Drawn & Quarterly. The exhibitors at Expozine comme from a diversity of publishing and print-based practices from both Francophone and Anglophone communities.

== History ==
The first Expozine took place in 2002 and has continued to showcase independent publishing from around the world every subsequent year.

The first editions of Expozine were held at the Sala Rossa (2002), Relais Mont-Royal (2003) and Station C (2004) and for several years following in the basement of the Saint-Enfant-Jesus church in the Mile End neighbourhood. More recent editions have been held at Église Saint-Denis (2016, 2017) and Église Saint-Arsène (2018, 2019). The 2020 edition was held as a virtual fair.

In 2015, ARCMTL was listed among the finalists for the 30th annual Grand Prix du Conseil des arts de Montréal, for their organisation of Expozine.

== Expozine Alternative Press Awards ==
The Expozine Alternative Press Awards recognize the best of the publications available at a given year's Expozine fair. It awards publications in several categories such as book, zine, and comic, in Canada's two official languages of English and French. The awards are granted at an annual gala separate to the main Expozine event.

== Distroboto ==
Expozine has a year-round companion project called Distroboto, which consists of a citywide network of cigarette machines repurposed to dispense small press publications. The Distroboto zine vending machines are placed in various locations around the city.
