= Sivananda Radha Saraswati =

Sivananda Radha
- Born: Sylvia Demitz; March 20, 1911
- Died: November 30, 1995 (aged 84)
- Other name: Ursula Sylvia Hellman
- Occupation: Yoga guru
- Years active: 1956–1995
- Known for: Yasodhara Ashram, transpersonal psychology trainings
- Notable work: Kundalini Yoga for the West

Sivananda Radha Saraswati (March 20, 1911 – November 30, 1995), born Sylvia Demitz, was a German yogini who emigrated to Canada and founded Yasodhara Ashram in British Columbia. She established a Western-based lineage in the Sivananda tradition and published books on several branches of Yoga, including Kundalini Yoga for the West and Mantras: Words of Power. She was a member of the California Institute of Transpersonal Psychology and developed transpersonal psychology workshops to help students prepare for intense spiritual practice. Yasodhara teachers trained at Yasodhara Ashram can now be found across North America and in Europe, the Caribbean, Japan, Australia and New Zealand.

== Biography ==
=== Early life ===
Sivananda Radha (born as Sylvia Demitz, and during her marriage known as Ursula Sylvia Hellman) was born in Germany on March 20, 1911. She became a creative writer, photographer and a solo concert dancer early in life. She lived through both wars in Berlin but learned from her experiences that life can be cruel and came to question the existence of God.

Her first marriage ended when her husband, Wolfgang, was executed at Buchenwald for helping Jewish friends leave Germany. She married again in 1947. Albert Hellman was a composer and violinist, but he died after one year of marriage. She also lost both parents in the war. "Thoroughly sick at heart with the brutality and stupidity of the world", she survived and, in 1951, emigrated to Canada settling in Montreal, finding work in the advertising department of a chemical firm, and becoming a Canadian citizen.

=== Spiritual life ===
A search for the meaning of life through yoga and meditation took her to India to Sivananda Saraswati of Rishikesh.

Sivananda challenged her to think deeply about the purpose of life. ‘He used every moment to teach you something’. His commitment to selfless service made a deep impression on her and Karma Yoga became a key practice in her own life and subsequently in the running of her Ashram. She was initiated into sanyas and given the name Sivananda Radha Saraswati on 2 February 1956. In her publications she described extraordinary events that followed her initiation: she writes that she met the legendary yogi Babaji, the deathless avatar described by Paramahansa Yogananda in Autobiography of a Yogi, the first time in a visionary experience in Montreal.

Upon return to Canada, interpreting her initiation into sanyas as a commitment to abstain "from all actions which arise from ambition and selfish desire … giving up mental and emotional attachment to life in this world" she began a new life in Montreal with no money or employment, learning to live on the charity of others. However, she quickly attracted attention in her orange sari, with her unconventional life-style, and through her willingness to speak publicly about her experiences in India. Within a few months, she was offering yoga classes, had been interviewed on CBC radio, travelled to Ottawa to speak, and been sponsored by the Canadian-India Association to fly to Vancouver to lecture on Indian philosophy.

Within a year, in 1957, in Burnaby, British Columbia, she founded Sivananda Ashram, in an old ten-roomed house, where she offered classes, meditation and satsangs. She also opened the Yoga Vedanta Bookstore on Robson Street in downtown Vancouver. In 1963, the Ashram moved to its present location and was renamed Yasodhara Ashram. Sivananda Radha also gave sanyas initiations to the young men who accompanied her and worked with her to establish the Ashram, beginning a new, Western based lineage, honouring the traditions of the Saraswati Order.

For many years she focussed on establishing the Ashram, making forest cabins habitable, constructing new buildings, corresponding with students, establishing yoga teaching programs and publishing a newsletter to raise funds and draw people to the Ashram. ‘In the early years of the Ashram … traveling … was necessary to give workshops and lectures to “put the ashram on the map” as she called it.’ She visited England, the Netherlands and Germany, and frequently toured throughout North America. She lectured in many North American universities and, in 1976, co-led a conference with Herbert Guenther at Yasodhara Ashram on the role of gurus in the West. At a time when understanding of the relationships between Yoga, science and psychology were in their infancy, Radha took an active interest. In Minneapolis, she participated in biofeedback experiments with Dr. Jose Feola, exploring the nature of the effects of spiritual practices, and she contributed to Scientific Conferences, such as the Council Grove Conference in Kansas. Discovering the need for students to deal with their psychological and emotional obstacles before embarking on intense spiritual practice, she also embraced transpersonal psychology, becoming a faculty member and graduate teacher at California Institute of Transpersonal Psychology, and developing a course on ‘Psychology towards Higher Consciousness’ that she taught at Antioch College, Seattle.

In the 1980s and early 1990s her organizational legacy took shape. Sivananda Radha opened yoga centres in North America, Mexico and England where classes and satsangs were offered by teachers trained at Yasodhara Ashram. A Temple, dedicated to the Light in All Religions, was opened at her Ashram in 1992. She died peacefully at her teaching centre in Spokane, in Washington State, in the early morning, 30 November 1995.

== Legacy ==
Sivananda Radha was among the prominent disciples of Sivananda who developed new organizations that are not affiliated to the original ashrams run by the Divine Life Society. Radha established an independent and primarily female, Western lineage as part of the Saraswati Order. Radhananda Saraswati was President and Spiritual Director from December 1993 to May 2014. She initiated aspirants and oversaw of the work of non-profit organizations supporting teachers in different countries. Radhananda has described her spiritual training at the feet of Sivananda Radha in her memoir, Carried by a Promise: A Life Transformed by Yoga. Swami Lalitananda Saraswati, a student of Radha's since 1979 and the Hidden Language Hatha Yoga columnist at ascent magazine since 1999, was appointed President in 2014. Her book The Inner Life of Asanas (2007) guides students through 25 Hatha Yoga postures, complemented by themed reflections that encourage deep inquiry into the Self.

Sivananda Radha formed the Timeless Books imprint in 1978 and wrote many books of yoga, including Kundalini Yoga for the West. Swami Sivananda Radha refers to Kundalini as a form of divine energy and details its potential for personal transformation. Tailored for Western practitioners, the book emphasizes the importance of balancing spiritual practices with everyday responsibilities and challenges, and includes instructional guidance on how to integrate Kundalini Yoga into daily life through mantra (words of power), asanas (postures), pranayama (breathing exercises), and meditation practices.

Other books include, Hatha Yoga: The Hidden Language, The Divine Light Invocation, and Mantras: Words of Power. Her memoirs are published in Radha: Diary of a Woman's Search and her experiences with gurus and other spiritual teachers are reported in In the Company of the Wise. Her books have been translated into 5 languages.

== Works ==
- From the Mating Dance to the Cosmic Dance, (Spokane, WA, 1992)
- "Guru-Disciple Relationship", Lifetime Magazine (March 1992)
- Hatha Yoga the Hidden Language (Spokane, WA, 1987, 1995, 2006)
- "Heart" in Kundalini Rising, by Gurmukh Kaur Khalsa, Ken Wilber, Swami Radha, Gopi Krishna (2009)
- In the Company of the Wise (Spokane, WA, 1991, 2011)
- Kundalini Yoga for the West (Spokane, WA, 1978, 2011)
- Light and Vibration: Mysticism and the Culmination of Yoga (Spokane, WA, 2007)
- Mantras: Words of Power (Spokane, WA, 1980, 1994, 2005)
- "On Meditation", in ed., N. Armstrong, Harvest of Light (London, 1976)
- On Sanyas: the Yoga of Renunciation (Spokane, WA, 2010)
- Radha: Diary of a Woman"s Search (Spokane, WA, 1981, 2002, 2011)
- Realities of the Dreaming Mind: The Practice of Dream Yoga (Spokane, WA, 1994, 1996, 2004)
- Seeds of Light (Spokane, WA, 1985, 1991)
- "The Dance of Life", Yoga Centre of Victoria (September, 1983)
- The Devi of Speech: the goddess in kundalini yoga (Spokane, WA, 2005)
- The Divine Light Invocation (Spokane, WA, 2006)
- "The Last Message", Yoga Centre of Victoria (December 1995 - January 1996)
- "The Search for Union", in ed., S. Miners, A Spiritual Approach to Male/Female Relations (IL, 1984)
- The Yoga of Healing (Spokane, WA, 2006)
- Time to be Holy: Collected Satsang Talks (Spokane, WA, 1996, 2010)
- When you first called me Radha (Spokane, WA, 2005)
- "Women and Spirituality: First Steps to the Spiritual Life", in ed., T. King, The Spiral Path: Explorations in Women"s Spirituality (St Paul, MN, 1992)
- "Women"s Place in Today"s World", in ed., S. Grof, Ancient Wisdom and Modern Science (New York, 1984)
