= Daniel Blomgren =

Swedish football player

Personal information
- Full name: Daniel Blomgren
- Date of birth: 23 August 1982 (age 44)
- Place of birth: Ulricehamn, Sweden
- Height: 5 ft 10 in (1.78 m)
- Position: Defender

Team information
- Current team: IFK Ulricehamn

Youth career
- IFK Ulricehamn

Senior career*
Years	Team	Apps	(Gls)
2000	IFK Ulricehamn	10	(0)
2001–2006	GAIS	125	(3)
2007–2008	FK Bodø/Glimt	2	(0)
2009–2013	IK Sirius	40	(2)
2012–2013	→ IK Frej (loan)	25	(2)
2014–	IFK Ulricehamn	0	(0)
- * Club domestic league appearances and goals

Daniel Blomgren (born 23 August 1982 in Ulricehamn) is a Swedish football player, who currently plays for IK Sirius of Division 1 Norra.
