= Lance Blomgren =

Canadian writer

- Born: 1970 (age 55–56); Cumberland, British Columbia
- Education: University of Victoria; Concordia University
- Occupation: writer

Lance Blomgren (born 1970) is a Canadian writer who is known for his published fiction and essays.

He grew up in Courtenay, British Columbia and spent various years living and writing in Victoria, British Columbia, Montreal, Quebec, Las Cruces, New Mexico and Vancouver, British Columbia.

He completed a degree from the University of Victoria in Victoria, British Columbia, and in 2000 a master's degree from Concordia University in Montreal, Quebec.

Apart from his books, Blomgren's writing has appeared frequently in Matrix magazine (Montreal), ascent magazine (Montreal), Geist, (Vancouver) and Visual Codec (Seattle).

In 1998, his publication, Liner won the Canadian bpNichol Award. In 2004, his collection Corner Pieces was nominated for the Canadian ReLit Award.

He is also noted as a curator and critic of contemporary visual art, having curated for the Rad'a gallery in Montreal, the Helen Pitt Gallery in Vancouver, and the Klondike Institute of Art and Culture in Dawson City, Yukon, and having published writing about art in various journals and publications internationally including, Art Asia Pacific (New York), Fillip (Vancouver, British Columbia) and Informal Architectures (London, United Kingdom, Black Dog Publishing).

== Books ==
- Practice, Intrepid Tourist Press, Union Bay, British Columbia, 1995.
- Manual for Beginners, (co-authored with Yvette Poorter) Intrepid Tourist Press, Oakville, Ontario, 1996.
- Liner, ITP Books, Union Bay, British Columbia, 1998.
- Walkups, conundrum press, Montreal, Quebec, 2000.
- Oasis, Saidye Bronfman Centre for the Arts, Montreal, Quebec, 2001.
- Corner Pieces, conundrum press, Montreal Quebec, 2004.
- Walkups: Scènes de la vie Montréalaise, Editions Adage, Montreal, Quebec / Editions Maelstrom, Brussels, Belgium, 2007.
