= Art-o-mat =

Vending machine dispensing small artwork

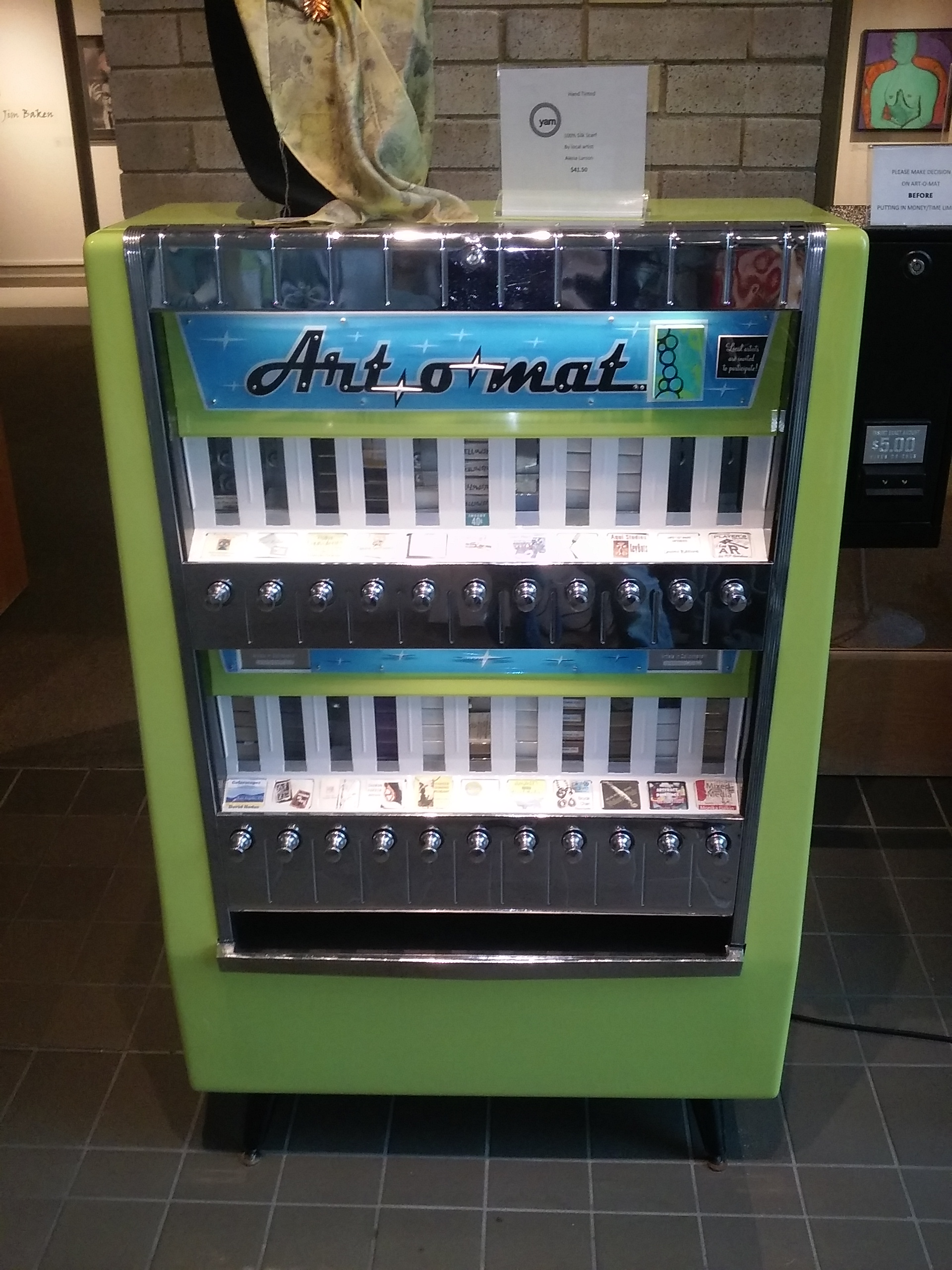
An Art-o-mat machine in the Yellowstone Art Museum.

Art-o-mat machines are repurposed cigarette vending machines that dispense cigarette pack-sized artwork.

Clark Whittington installed the first Art-o-mat at an art show in June 1997 that dispensed black & white photographs for $1.00 each.

There are over 200 machines worldwide and 400 contributing artists. In 2010, six machines were installed at the Cosmopolitan of Las Vegas.
