= Ascent (magazine) =

Defunct independent, not-for-profit magazine

ascent
- ascent 's (Summer 2008)
- Editor: Roseanne Harvey
- Categories: yoga magazine
- Frequency: Quarterly
- First issue: September 1969
- Final issue: 2009
- Company: Yasodhara Ashram Society
- Country: Canada
- Based in: Montreal
- Language: English
- Website: www.ascentmagazine.com
- ISSN: 0315-8179

ascent was an independent, not-for-profit magazine published quarterly that explores the intersection of spiritual values with social and political issues, art, culture and contemporary thought. ascent also published a website, a blog, books, and held an annual retreat at Yasodhara Ashram. The tag line for the magazine was "Yoga for an inspired life". Its offices were based in Montreal, Quebec, Canada.

== History ==
ascent started as an in-house journal for Yasodhara Ashram in 1963. It was founded by Swami Sivananda Radha who started teaching yoga in Montreal, Quebec, Canada, in 1956 when she returned from India where she was initiated into Sanyas by Swami Sivananda Saraswati of Rishikesh. In 1959, she moved to the West coast of Canada and established an ashram in Burnaby, British Columbia. She instructed people in Indian dance, hatha yoga, mantra, and meditation. Within a few years Swami Sivananda Radha began looking for land outside of the city. In 1963 she established Yasodhara Ashram, a spiritual retreat center, on Kootenay Lake near Nelson, British Columbia.

In July 1963 she began sending out a monthly newsletter to her associates and friends. They functioned as a way to keep people engaged with the work and activities being carried out at the ashram. In the mid-sixties the newsletter began to include more commentaries on spiritual practices such as meditation, mantra, hatha yoga, and the Divine Light Invocation.

The first ascent, featuring an artist's rendering of the Temple of Divine Light, 1969

In 1969 the newsletter became a bi-monthly publication and changed its name to ascent. It was printed in a booklet format and cost 50 cents. It included an article by Swami Radha, news and photos of the ashram, and concluded with an article by a guest author. Guest authors include Swami Sivananda Saraswati and Swami Chidananda Saraswati of the Divine Life Society, Rishikesh, India. Throughout the 80s and 90s the direction of ascent was primarily focused on acting as a vehicle for the teachings of Swami Sivananda Radha, as a promotion for the ashram courses, and to share experiences of people who had participated in ashram courses.

In 1992 the Temple of Divine Light at Yasodhara Ashram was completed. This is a dome structure designed with 8 doors and 8 major arches to symbolize the unity in the 8 major religions. This integral and inquisitive approach to spirituality would come to influence the direction of ascent it was launched as a nationally distributed magazine in 1999. The ascent editorial offices moved to Montreal and there was no longer a focus on the day-to-day activities of Yasodhara Ashram. The magazine continued to focus on the teachings of Swami Sivananda Radha but also showcased the spiritual experiences of many authors and artists from various traditions and fields of thought.

== Editorial focus ==
Each issue of ascent centered around a specific theme. There was an emphasis on personal narrative and translating the philosophy of yoga and other spiritual traditions into practical reflections. ascent regularly published articles and art-work submitted by its readers. Past themes include gender and sexuality, family, healing and food. Each Issue features the following regular columns:

- editorial
- from the desk of Swami Radhananda - an article from the president and spiritual director of Yasodhara Ashram
- hidden language hatha yoga - Swami Lalitananda blends real-life reflections with Hatha Yoga instruction and penetrating questions that point to the spiritual roots of the practice.
- from the archives - A previously unpublished article by Swami Sivananda Radha.
- tales from the vase (graphic column by Billy Mavreas)
- Kuanyin's kitchen
- reviews
- epilogue

== Featured authors and interviews ==
Matthieu Ricard, Noah Levine, Daphne Marlatt, Susan Musgrave, Amy Goodman, Zacharias Kunuk, Karen Armstrong, John Wood of Room to Read, TKV Desikachar, Edgar Mitchell, Dr. David Suzuki, Lance Blomgren, Alice Coltrane, Deepa Mehta, Jean-Marc Vallée, Velcrow Ripper, Sharon Salzberg, Pier Giorgio Di Cicco, bell hooks, Linda Montano, David Sylvian, Thubten Chodron, Wayne Teasdale, Georg Feuerstein, Wade Davis, Krishna Das, Pico Iyer, Jane Siberry, Joan Halifax Roshi, Bo Lozoff, Arundhati Roy, Tenzin Palmo, Satish Kumar, Natalie Goldberg, Gabrielle Roth, Llewellyn Vaughan-Lee, Albert Low, Jeremy Narby

== Books ==
ascent published through its sister company Timeless Books in Toronto, Ontario.

- Inspired Lives: The Best of Real Life Yoga From ascent Magazine Edited by Clea McDougall (Timeless Books, 2005)
- The Inner Life of Asanas By Swami Lalitananda (Timeless Books, 2007)
- The Glass Seed By Eileen Delehanty Pearkes (Timeless Books, 2007)
- Inside Outside Overlap: A Boy Priest and Lifeform the "Cat" Adventure by Billy Mavreas (Timeless Books, 2008)

== Awards ==
- 2006 nominated for 6th consecutive Utne Independent Press Award
- 2006 Canadian National Magazine Award Nomination for Swami Lalitananda's column on Hidden Language Hatha Yoga
- 2006 Canadian National Magazine Award Nomination
- 2005 Winner of the Utne Independent Press Award for Best Spiritual Coverage
- 2003 Winner of the Utne Independent Press Award for Best Spiritual Coverage
- 2002 Canadian National Magazine Award Nomination
