= Taspo =

Japanese electronic money system

A Taspo card

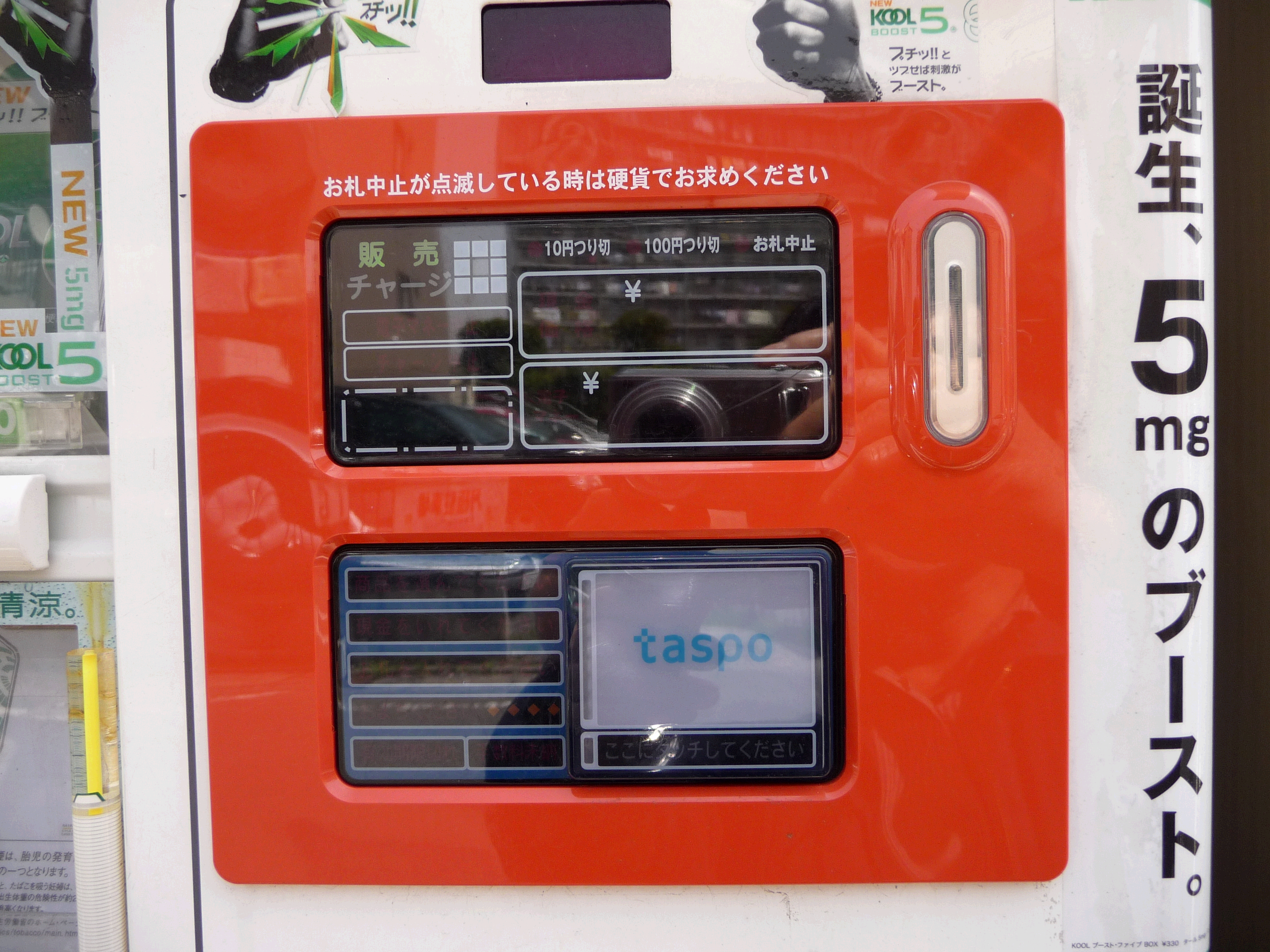
Taspo age verification unit on a cigarette vending machine

Taspo (タスポ), formerly known as Tobacco Card (たばこカード, tabako kādo), was a smart card using RFID developed by the Tobacco Institute of Japan (TIOJ), the Nationwide Association of Tobacco Retailers (全国タバコ販売協同組合連合会, Zenkoku Tabako Hanbai Kyōdō Kumiai Rengōkai), and the Japan Vending Machine Manufacturers Association (日本自動販売機工業会, Nihon Jidōhanbaiki Kōgyōkai) for introduction in 2008. Following its introduction, the card is necessary in order to purchase cigarettes from vending machines in Japan. The name "Taspo" is a portmanteau for "tobacco passport" (たばこのパスポート, tabako no pasupōto).

The group announced plans for development of the Tobacco Card in 2001. The stated aim is to reduce smoking by underaged people. Testing began the following year, and a second round of testing followed in 2004.

Details of the card were announced in 2005. The card incorporates an integrated circuit that contains information about the age of the holder. Card issuance is restricted so that only adults aged 20 and over may acquire the cards. The cards are contactless, so that vending machines will be able to read them without contact. The cards are able to store value, giving purchasers the option to pay by card or by cash. Users are able to add more value at vending machines.

Consumers can apply for the cards by filling out a form available at tobacco retailers and mailing it, along with a copy of a verifiable identification document (driver's license, health-insurance card, etc.) and a facial photo to TIOJ. No fees are required to obtain the card. Cardholders can cancel lost or stolen cards by contacting TIOJ to remotely disable the cards' use at vending machines.

The final pilot program began in March 2008, and was phased in after that, becoming operational nationwide by 1 July 2008.

Taspo has been discontinued starting April 1, 2026 as the mobile network the terminals ran on had been shut down.

== See also ==
- Smoking in Japan
