= Francis Huxley =

British zoologist and anthropologist

- Born: 28 August 1923; Holywell, Oxford, England
- Died: 29 October 2016 (aged 93); Sebastopol, California, US
- Education: Dauntsey's School; Oxford University
- Known for: Founding Survival International
- Parents: Julian Huxley; Juliette Huxley
- Scientific career
- Fields: Zoology, anthropology
- Workplaces: St Catherine’s College, Oxford

Francis John Heathorn Huxley (28 August 1923 – 29 October 2016) was a British zoologist, anthropologist and author. With a short professional career at St Catherine’s College, Oxford, he is best known for his several anthropological expeditions to The Gambia, the Amazon, and Haiti, among other places, from which he wrote several notable books.

== Early life and education ==
Huxley was the younger son of Julian Huxley and Juliette (née Baillot). His brother Anthony became a botanist and scientific author. Born at the time when his father was a Fellow at New College, Oxford, and a Senior Demonstrator of zoology, he grew up in Oxford. As his father moved to King's College London, in 1925, to become professor of zoology, he spent the rest of his childhood in London. At age two, he entered a preparatory school at Byron House, but soon developed severe illnesses, including Bell’s palsy, whooping cough and eye infections. in 1933, he started elementary education at Frensham Heights School in Farnham, Surrey. Between 1937 and 1942, he studied at Gordonstoun School in Elgin, Scotland. He was briefly evacuated to Wales in 1939 as the World War II began.

== Service in World War II and higher education ==
In 1942, Huxley joined the Royal Navy and serve there through the war. He was Assistant Navigating Officer on HMS Ramilles, on D-Day, 6 June 1944. His ship was in preparation for invasion of Japan when the first atomic bombs devastated Hiroshima and Nagasaki in August 1945 that led to the end of the war. Around that time he met Claude Lévi-Strauss, a sociologist and a fighter in the French resistance, who later became his motivation in anthropology.

After the war, in 1947, Huxley enrolled for a course in zoology at Balliol College, Oxford. He completed the course with 2nd class honours in 1948. At the same time he joined the Royal Anthropological Institute of Great Britain and Ireland, which his great-grandfather, Thomas Huxley co-founded in 1871. Then, he took up social anthropology at the University of Oxford, earning his master's degree in 1950. Influenced by his teachers Meyer Fortes and Edward Evan Evans-Pritchard to continue PhD research, he went on an exploration of Amazonian tribes in Brazil in November 1950, under a joint project from the British Council and the Department of Scientific and Industrial Research. He spent most of 1951 with Brazilian anthropologist Darcy Ribeiro among the Ka'apor people. He returned to Brazil in 1953 for a study funded by the Brazilian government, and lived among the Ka'apor people alone from February to July. Back to England, he became Curator of Ethnography at the City of Liverpool Public Museum from 1954 to 1955. He wrote an account of his experience in Affable Savages, published in 1956.

== Later career ==
Apart from a spell from 1962 to 1968 as a lecturer and research fellow at St Catherine's College, Oxford, Francis Huxley worked outside of academic establishments. Huxley wrote books on voodoo, sacred healing, and mythic symbolism, and co-edited Shamans Through Time (2001) with Jeremy Narby. He was a founding member of Survival International, advocating for indigenous rights and participating in field missions to document the impact of economic expansion on Amazonian tribes.

== Works ==
- Affable Savages: An Anthropologist Among the Urubu Indians of Brazil. Viking, New York, 1957 [1956], ISBN 978-1879215276
- The Invisibles: Voodoo Gods in Haiti. Rupert Hart-Davis, London, 1966
- The Way of the Sacred. Doubleday, New York, 1974
- The Dragon. McMillan, New York, 1979
- Shamans Through Time: 500 Years on the Path to Knowledge, New York 2001, edited by Jeremy Narby and Francis Huxley ISBN 1-58542-091-3
- The Raven and the Writing Desk, an exploration of the writings of Lewis Carroll, in the Alice books, Harper & Row, New York, 1976
