= Vending machine =

Machine which dispenses products to customers

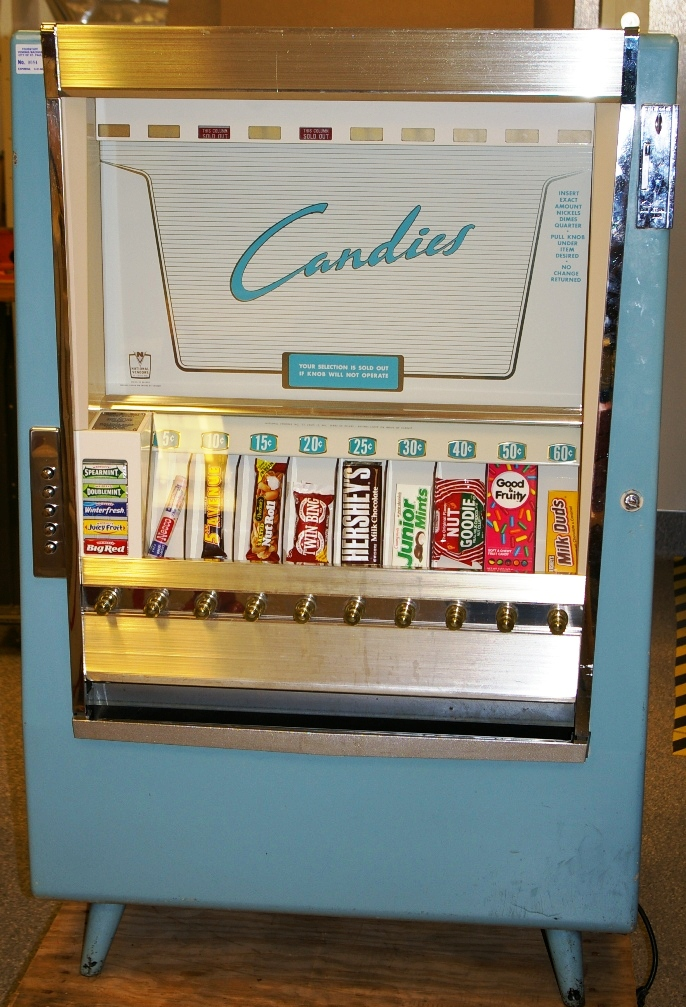
A snack food vending machine made in 1952

A vending machine is an automated machine that dispenses items such as snacks, beverages, cigarettes, and lottery tickets to consumers after cash, a credit card, or other forms of payment are inserted into the machine or payment is otherwise made. The first modern vending machines were developed in England in the early 1880s and dispensed postcards. Vending machines exist in many countries and, in more recent times, specialized vending machines that provide less common products compared to traditional vending machine items have been created.

== History ==
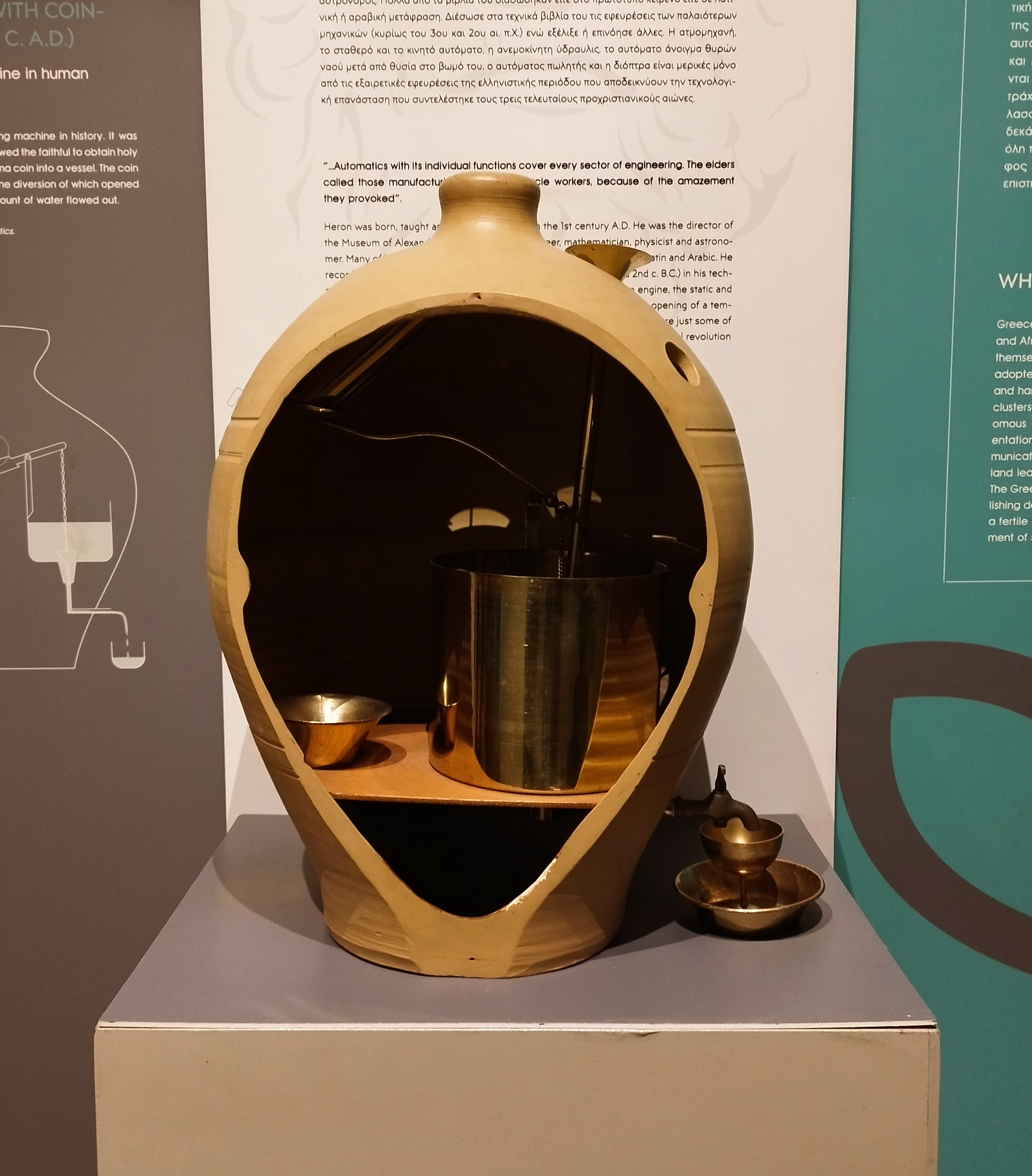
A reconstruction of an ancient vending machine in Kotsanas Museum of Ancient Greek Technology, Athens, Greece

The earliest known reference to a vending machine is in the work of Hero of Alexandria, an engineer and mathematician in 1st century AD Roman Egypt. His machine accepted a coin and then dispensed wine or holy water. When the coin was deposited, it fell upon a pan attached to a lever. The lever opened a valve which let some wine flow out. The pan continued to tilt with the weight of the coin until it fell off, at which point a counterweight snapped the lever up and turned off the valve.

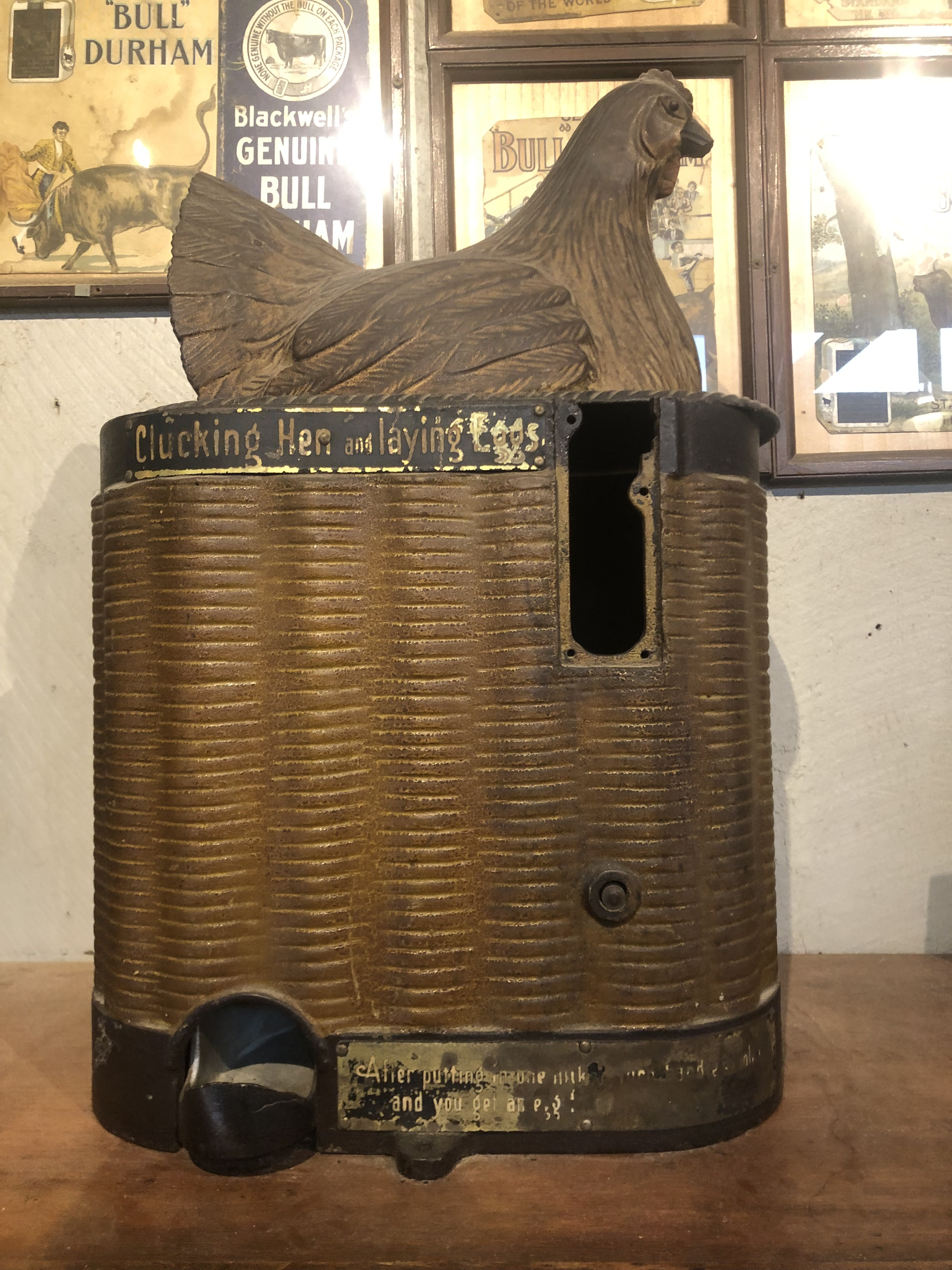
A novelty vending machine in the Western Trails Museum at Knott's Berry Farm

Some early novelty vending machines featured a clucking chicken which dispensed a toy-filled egg.

Coin-operated machines that dispensed tobacco were being operated as early as 1615 in the taverns of England. The machines were portable and made of brass. An English bookseller, Richard Carlile, devised a newspaper dispensing machine for the dissemination of banned works in 1822. Simon Denham was awarded British Patent no. 706 for his stamp dispensing machine in 1867, the first fully automatic vending machine.

=== Modern vending machines ===
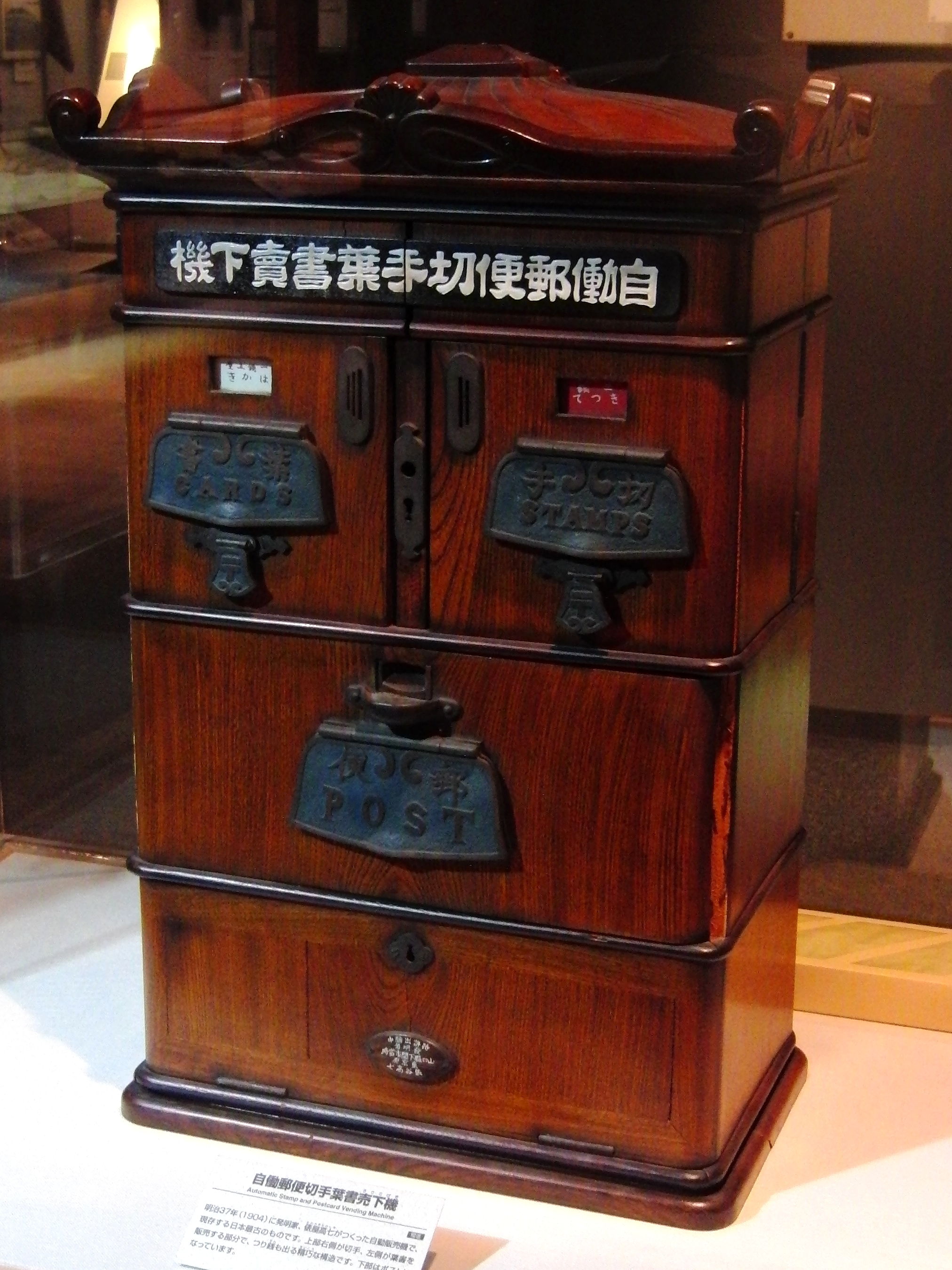
An automatic stamp and postcard vending machine, made by Takashichi Tawaraya in 1904 in Japan

The first modern coin-operated vending machines were introduced in London, England, in the early 1880s; they dispensed postcards. The machine was invented by Percival Everitt in 1883 and soon became a widespread feature at railway stations and post offices; it dispensed envelopes, postcards, and notepaper. The Sweetmeat Automatic Delivery Company was founded in 1887 in England as the first company to deal primarily with installing and maintaining vending machines. Also at about that time in England, Dixon Henry Davies and inventor John Mensy Tourtel patented a coin-operated reading lamp for use on trains and founded the Railway Automatic Electric Light Syndicate, Ltd. The system ran off batteries and delivered 30 minutes of light for 1d., but was not a long-term success. Tourtel also invented a similarly coin-operated gas meter. In 1893, Stollwerck, a German chocolate manufacturer, was selling its chocolate in 15,000 vending machines. It set up separate companies in various territories to manufacture vending machines to sell not just chocolate, but cigarettes, matches, chewing gum, and soap products.

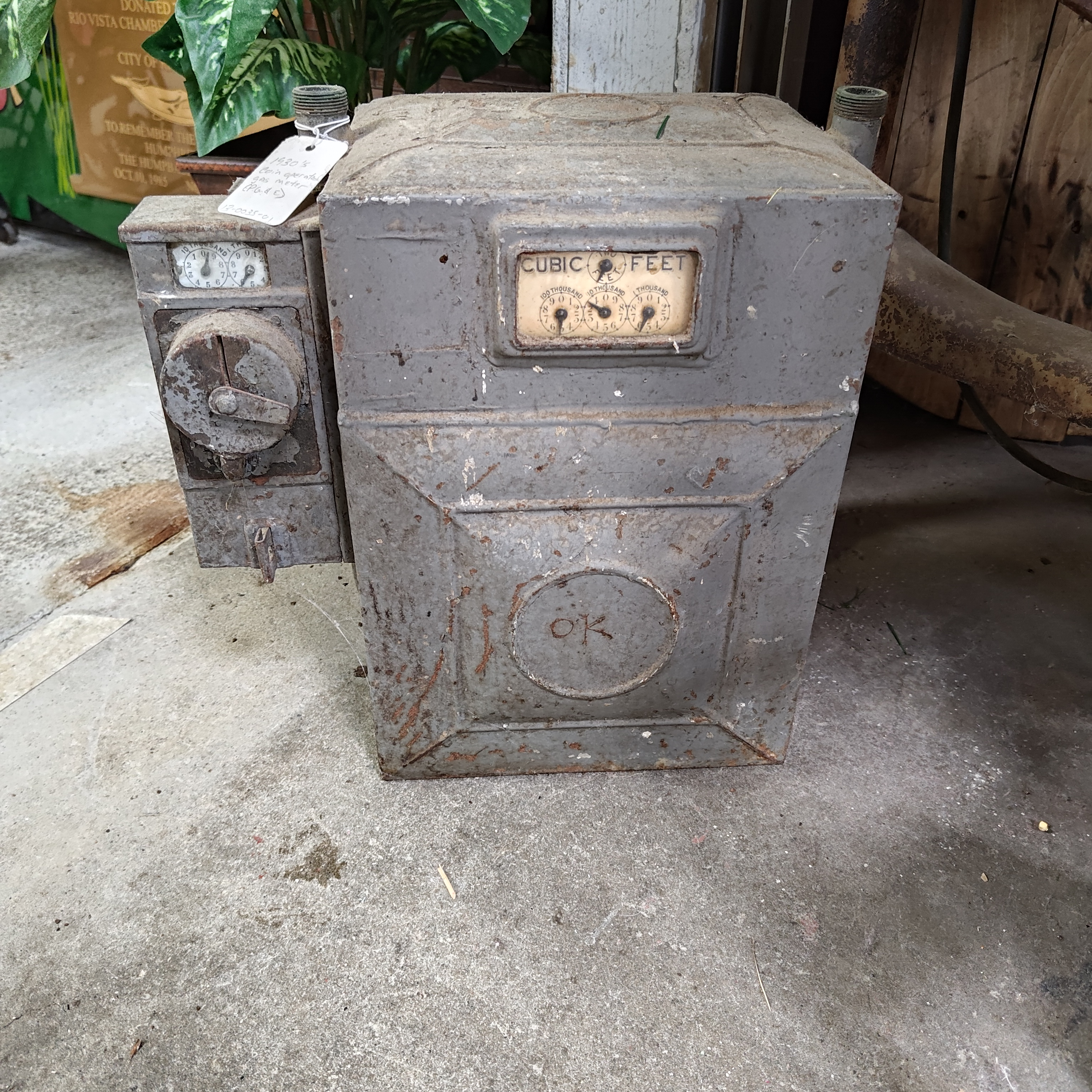
A coin operated gas meter from California, operated by PG&E

The first U.S. coin operated vending machine was invented in Minneapolis, Minnesota by William Henry Fruen in 1884, who patented the "Automatic Liquid Drawing Device", it was designed to look like a building and dispensed mineral water []. Later, in 1888 the early gum vending machine was invented by the Thomas Adams Gum Company, and it was used to sell sticks of chewing gum on New York City train platforms, and it led to the commercially successful gumball machine. The idea of adding games to these machines as a further incentive to buy came in 1897 when the Pulver Manufacturing Company added small figures, which would move around whenever somebody bought some gum from their machines. This idea spawned a whole new type of mechanical device known as the "trade stimulators". Coin operated gas meters could be found in the United States, Australia and England. This style of meter can still be found in some countries.

==== Growth ====
The vending machine industry in the United States is a multi-billion dollar sector. In 2023, it was estimated to be worth $18.2 billion, with approximately 3 million machines generating an average monthly revenue of $525. However, this is an average, and the industry is trending toward more sophisticated and automated vending machines, particularly in North America and Japan.

This trend is driven by the increasing demand for convenience and the development of advanced technologies. For instance, the hot food vending machine sector is valued at $4.8 billion and is seeing significant growth as robotics companies introduce automated solutions for dispensing pasta, burgers, and other groceries. The broader fresh food vending segment is projected to reach $8 billion by 2029, offering consumers more options for nutritious and convenient meals and snacks.

== Mechanisms ==
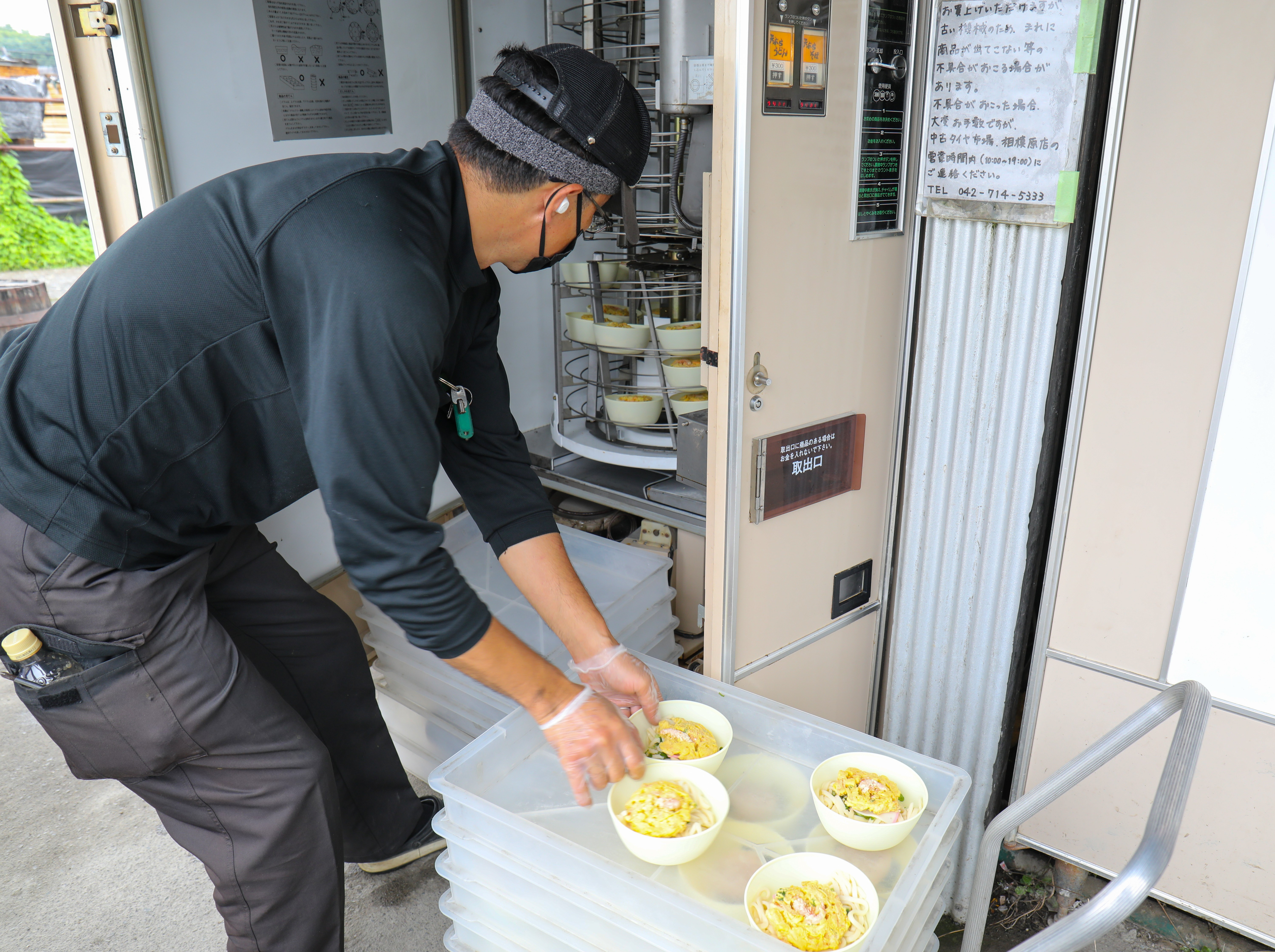
A vending machine at the Sagamihara Vending Machine Park in Sagamihara, Kanagawa Prefecture being restocked with freshly-cooked Udon

Internal communication in vending machines is typically based on the MDB standard, supported by the National Automatic Merchandising Association (NAMA) and the European Vending & Coffee Service Association (EVA).

After payment has been tendered, a product may become available by:

- the machine releasing it, so that it falls into an open compartment at the bottom, or into a cup, either released first, or put in by the customer, or
- the unlocking of a door, drawer, or turning of a knob.

Some products need to be prepared to become available. For example, tickets are printed or magnetized on the spot, and coffee is freshly concocted. One of the most common forms of vending machine, the snack machine, often uses a metal coil which when ordered rotates to release the product.

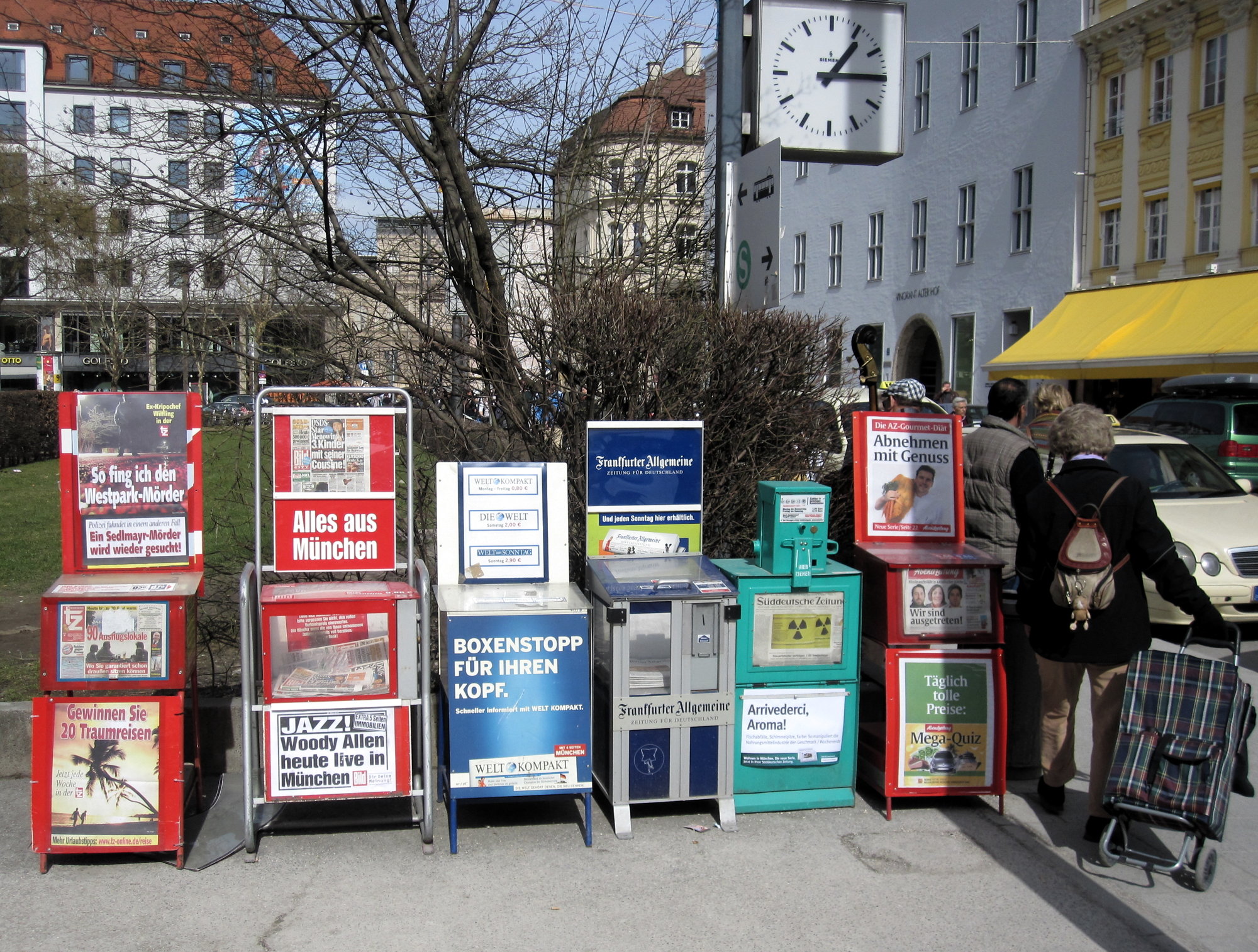
Newspaper vending machines in Munich

The main example of a vending machine giving access to all merchandise after paying for one item is a newspaper vending machine (also called vending box) found mainly in the U.S. and Canada. It contains a pile of identical newspapers. After a sale the door automatically returns to a locked position. A customer could open the box and take all of the newspapers or, for the benefit of other customers, leave all of the newspapers outside the box, slowly return the door to an unlatched position, or block the door from fully closing. These actions are frequently discouraged, sometimes by a security clamp. The success of such machines is predicated on the assumption that the customer will be honest (hence the nickname "honor box"), and take only one copy.

== Common vending machines ==
=== Change machine ===
A change machine is a vending machine that accepts large denominations of currency and returns an equal amount of currency in smaller bills or coins. Typically these machines are used to provide coins in exchange for paper currency, in which case they are also often known as bill changers.

=== Cigarette vending ===
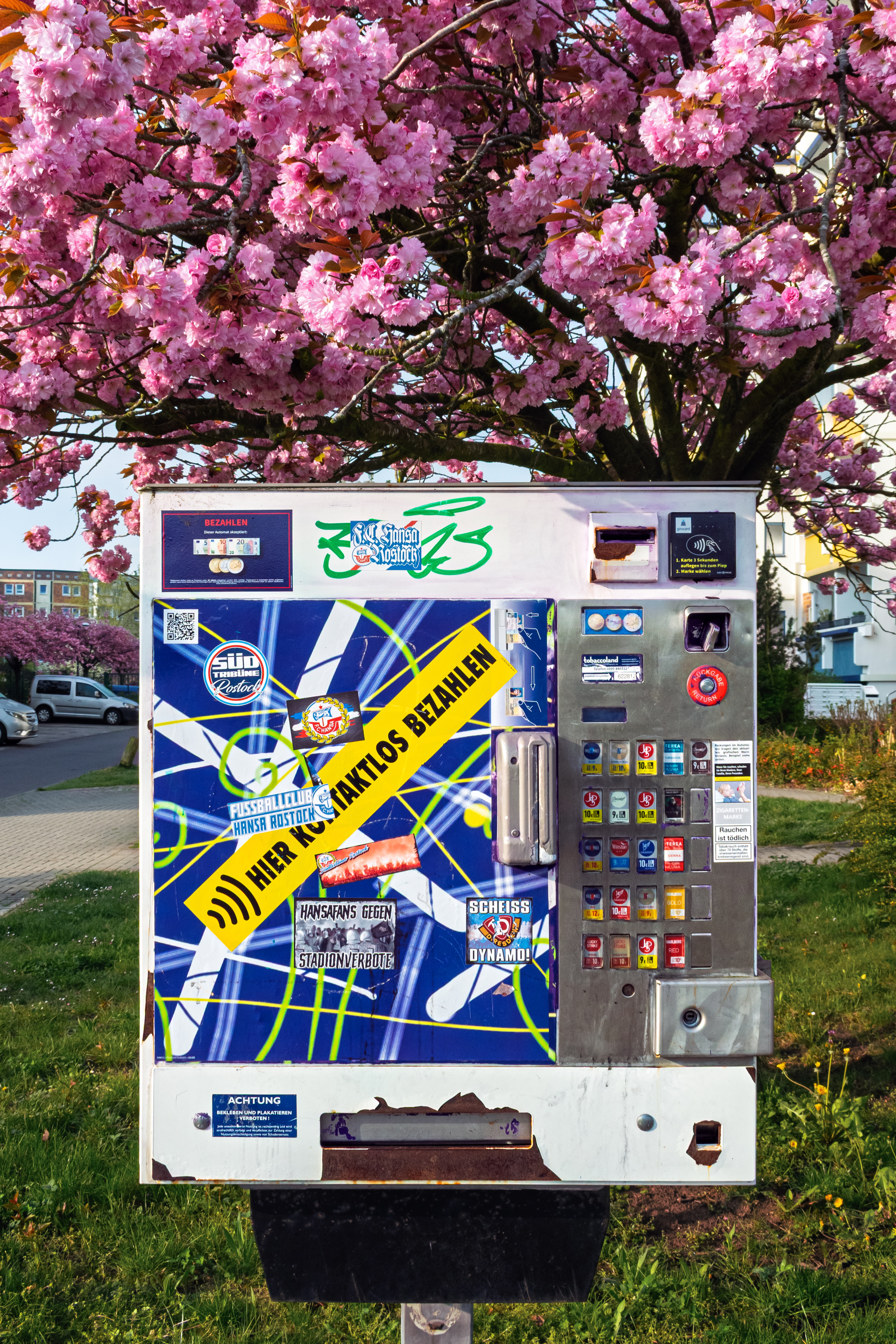
Cigarette machine beneath a cherry tree, Rostock, Germany

In the United States, federal regulations restrict tobacco vending machines to facilities where people under 21 are neither present nor permitted to enter. Sometimes a pass has to be inserted in the machine to prove one's age before a purchase can be made. In the United Kingdom, legislation banning them outright came into effect on 1 October 2011. In Germany, Austria, Italy, the Czech Republic, and Japan, cigarette machines are still common.

Since 2007, however, age verification has been mandatory in Germany and Italy – buyers must be 18 or over. The various machines installed in pubs and cafés, other publicly accessible buildings, and on the street accept one or more of the following as proof of age: the buyer's identity card, bank debit card (smart card), or European Union driver's license. In Japan, age verification has been mandatory since 1 July 2008 via the Taspo card, issued only to persons aged 20 or over. The Taspo card uses RFID, stores monetary value, and is contactless.

=== Birth control and condom vending machines ===
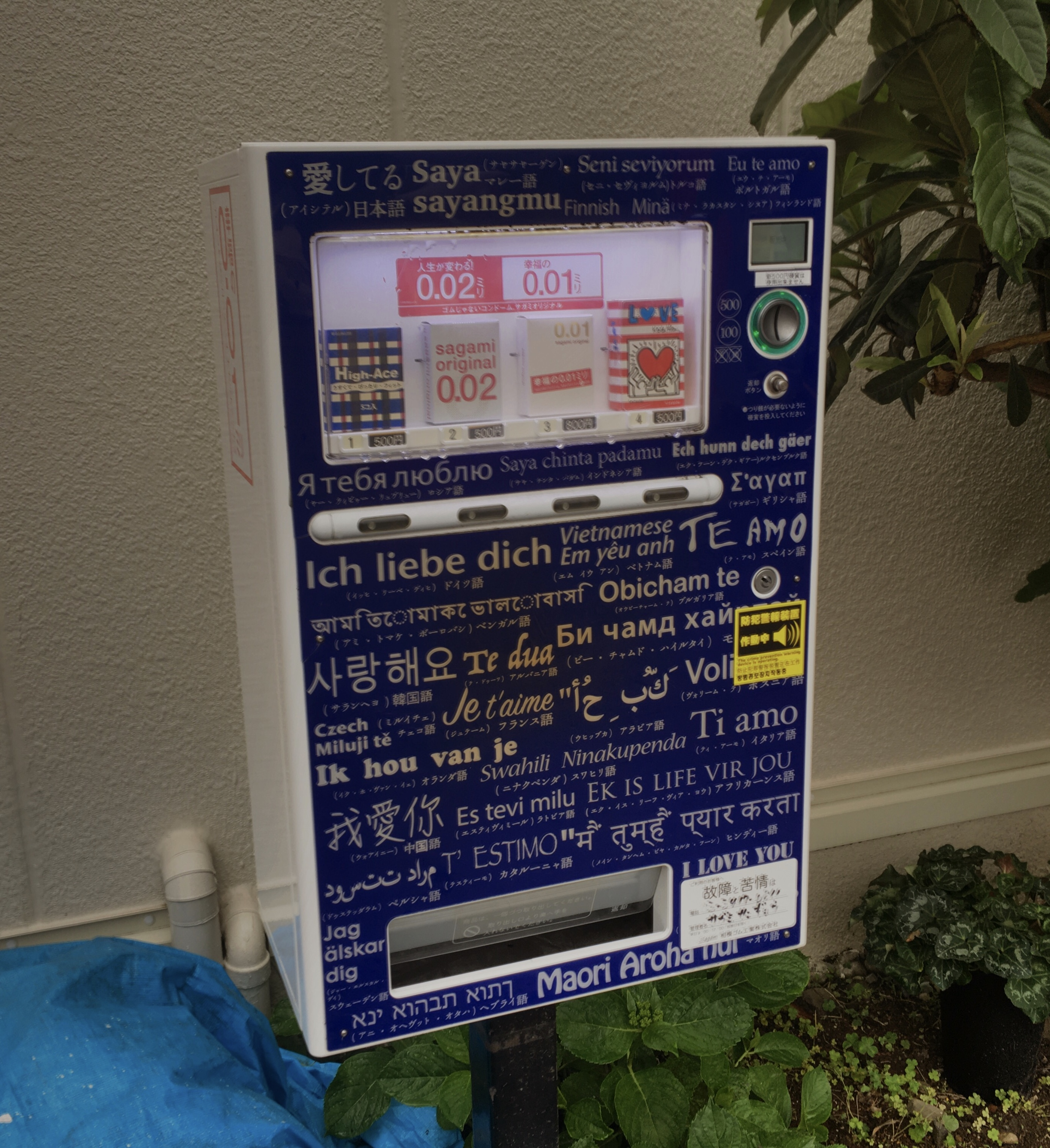
Condom vending machine in Tokyo, 2022

A birth control machine is a vending machine for the sale of birth control, such as condoms or emergency contraception. Condom machines are often placed in public toilets, subway stations, airports, or schools as a public health measure to promote safe sex. Many pharmacies also keep one outside, for after-hours access. Rare examples exist that dispense female condoms or the morning after pill.

=== Food and snack vending machines ===
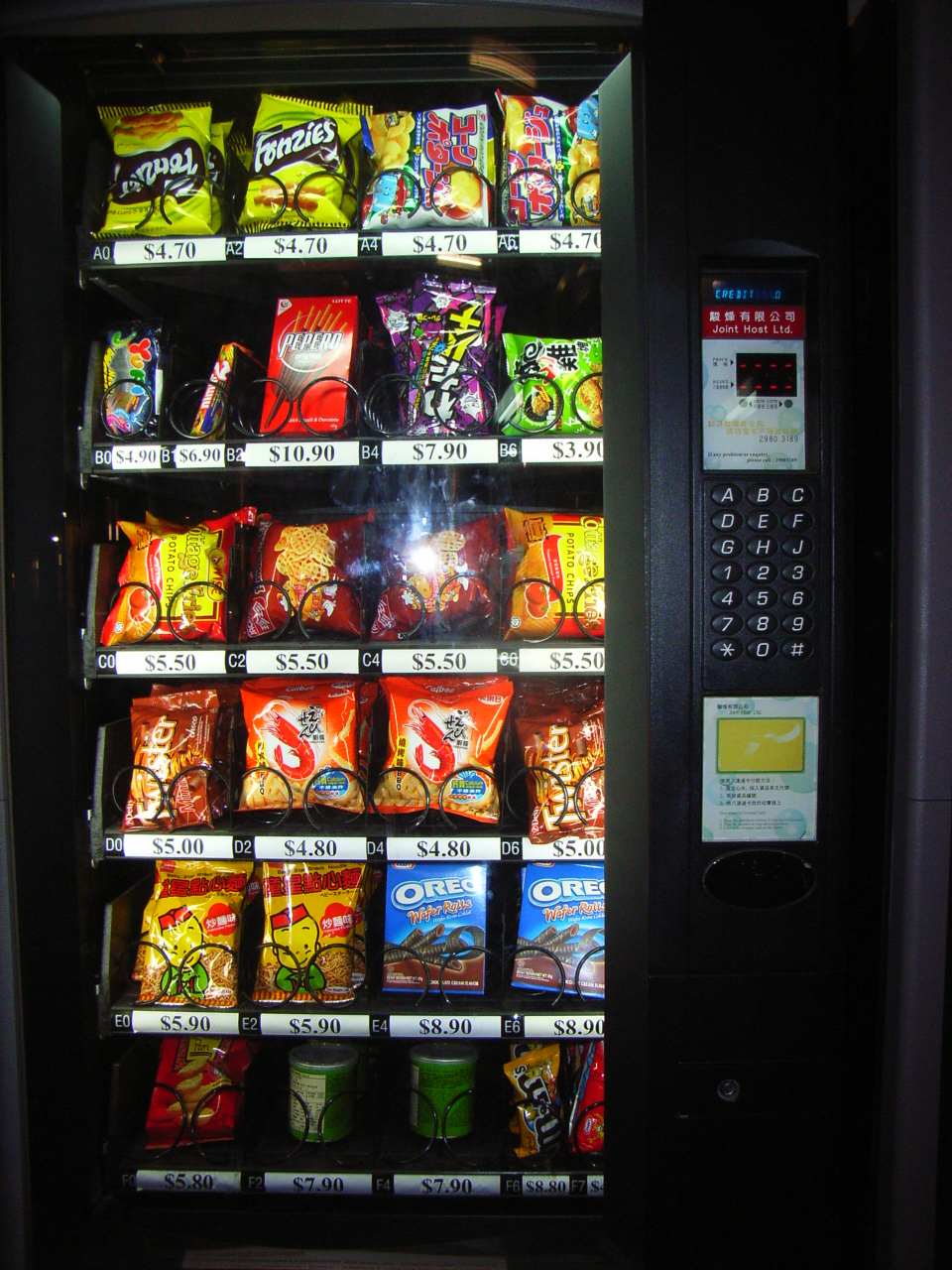
A snack food vending machine in Hong Kong

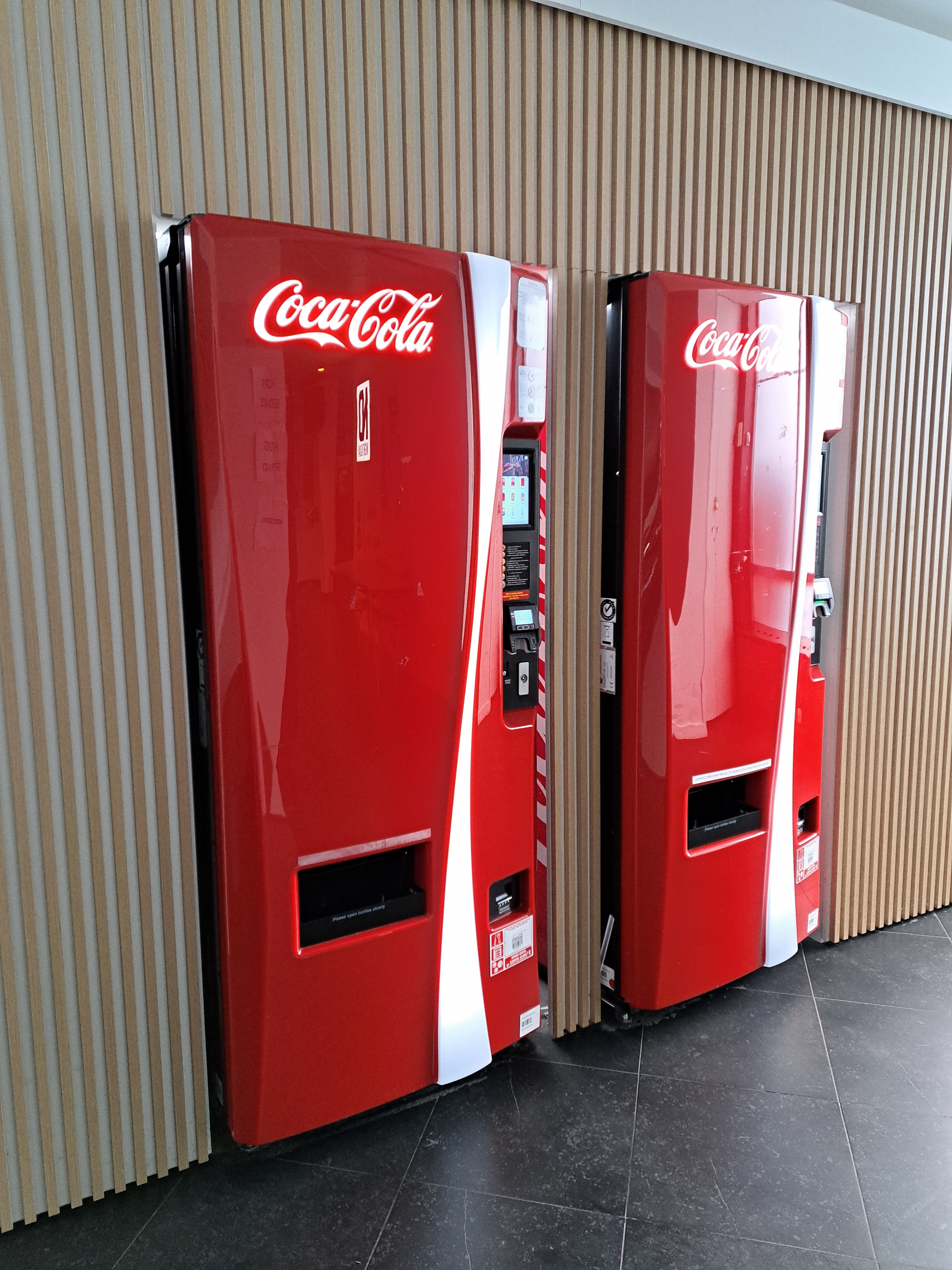
Coca-Cola-branded vending machines at a hospital in Belgium

Various types of food and snack vending machines exist around the world. Food vending machines that provide shelf-stable foods such as chips (crisps), cookies, cakes, and other such snacks are common. Some food vending machines are refrigerated or frozen, such as for chilled soft drinks and ice cream treats, and some machines provide hot food.

There are some less common specialised food vending machines, such as the French fry vending machine and hot pizza vending machines, such as Let's Pizza. The Beverly Hills Caviar Automated Boutique dispenses frozen caviar and other high-end foods.

==== Bulk candy and gumball vending ====
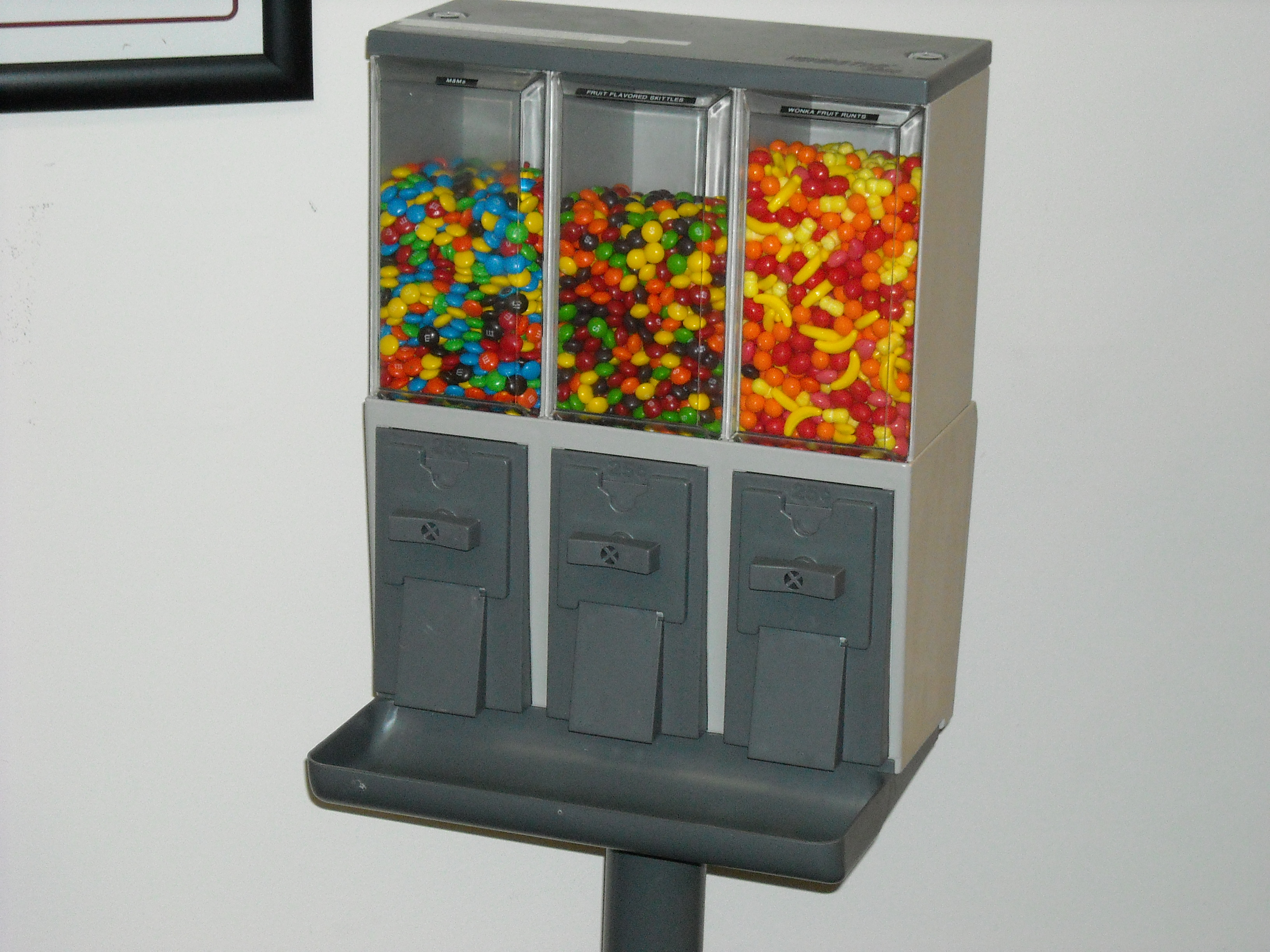
Bulk vending: a bulk candy machine containing M&M's, Skittles, and Runts

The profit margins in the bulk candy business can be quite high – gumballs, for instance, can be purchased in bulk for around 2 cents per piece and sold for 25 cents in gumball machines in the U.S., and other countries. Gumballs and candy have a relatively long shelf life, enabling vending machine operators to manage many machines without too much time or cost involved. In addition, the machines are typically inexpensive compared to soft drink or snack machines, which often require power and sometimes refrigeration to work. Many operators donate a percentage of the profits to charity so that locations will allow them to place the machines for free.

Bulk vending may be a more practical choice than soft drink/snack vending for an individual who also works a full-time job, since the restaurants, retail stores, and other locations suitable for bulk vending may be more likely to be open during the evening and on weekends than venues such as offices that host soft drink and snack machines.

The bulk vending machines of today provide many different vending choices with the use of adjustable gumball and candy wheels. Adjustable gumball wheels allow an operator to not only offer the traditional 1-inch gumball, but they can also vend larger gumballs, and non-edible items such as toy capsules and bouncy balls. Adjustable candy wheels allow an operator to offer a variety of pressed candies, jelly candy, chocolates and even nuts.

==== Full-line vending ====
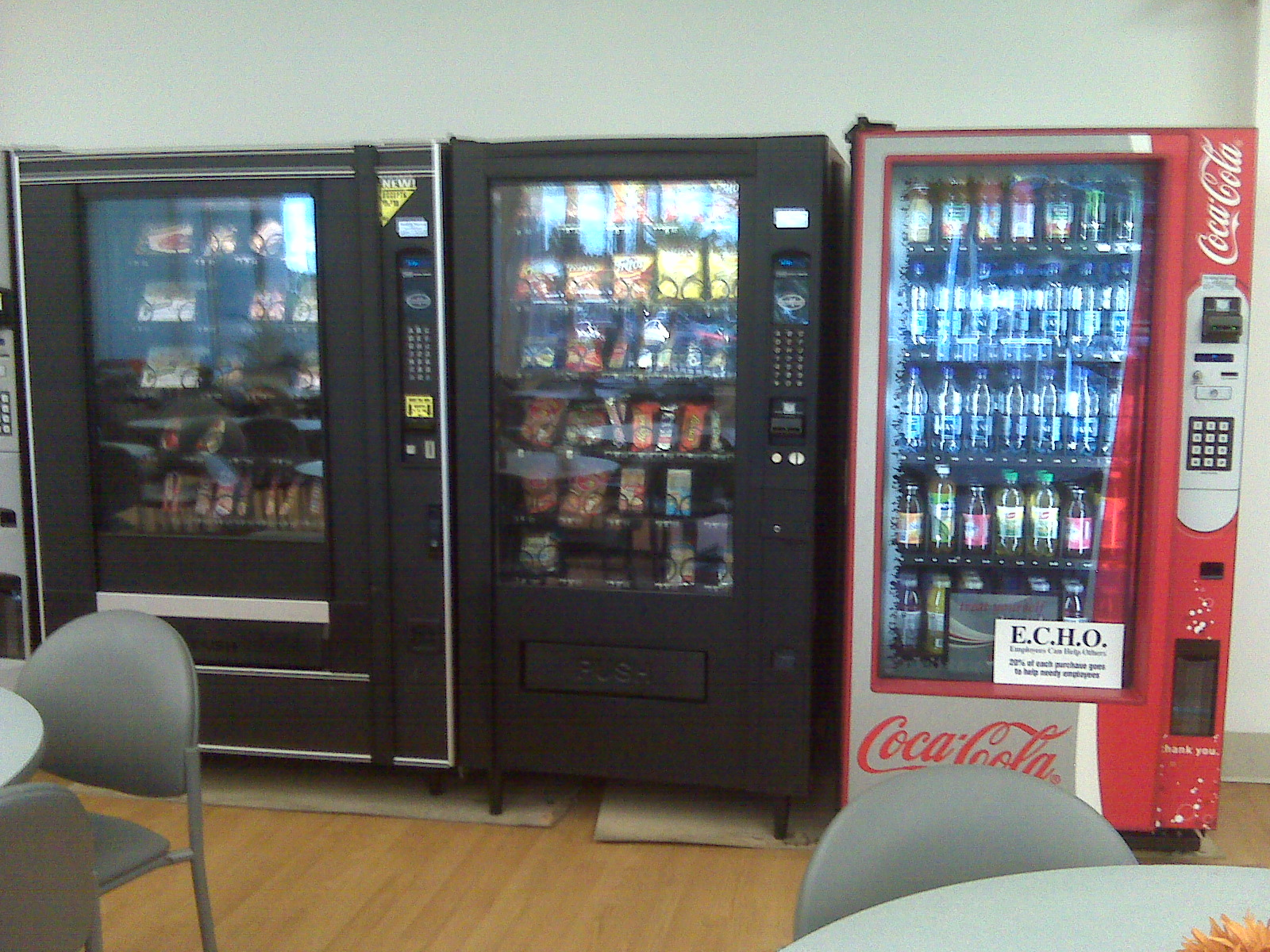
A full line of vending machines in a hospital cafeteria, including machines for drinks, snacks, and microwaveable foods

A full-line vending company may set up several types of vending machines that sell a wide range of products. Products may include candy, cookies, chips, fresh fruit, milk, cold food, coffee and other hot drinks, bottles and cans of soda and other drinks, and even frozen products like ice cream. These products can be sold from machines that include hot coffee, snack, cold food, and bottle machines. In the United States, almost all machines accept bills, and more and more machines accept $5 bills, along with payments by traditional debit and credit cards, or a mobile payment system. This is an advantage to the vendor because it virtually eliminates the need for a bill changer. Larger corporations with cafeterias will often request full line vending to supplement their food service.

=== Newspaper vending machine ===
A newspaper vending machine or newspaper rack is a vending machine designed to distribute newspapers. Newspaper vending machines are used worldwide, and they can be one of the main distribution methods for newspaper publishers. According to the Newspaper Association of America, in recent times in the United States, circulation via newspaper vending machines has dropped significantly: in 1996, around 46% of single-sale newspapers were sold in newspaper boxes, and in 2014, only 20% of newspapers were sold in the boxes.

=== Photo booth ===
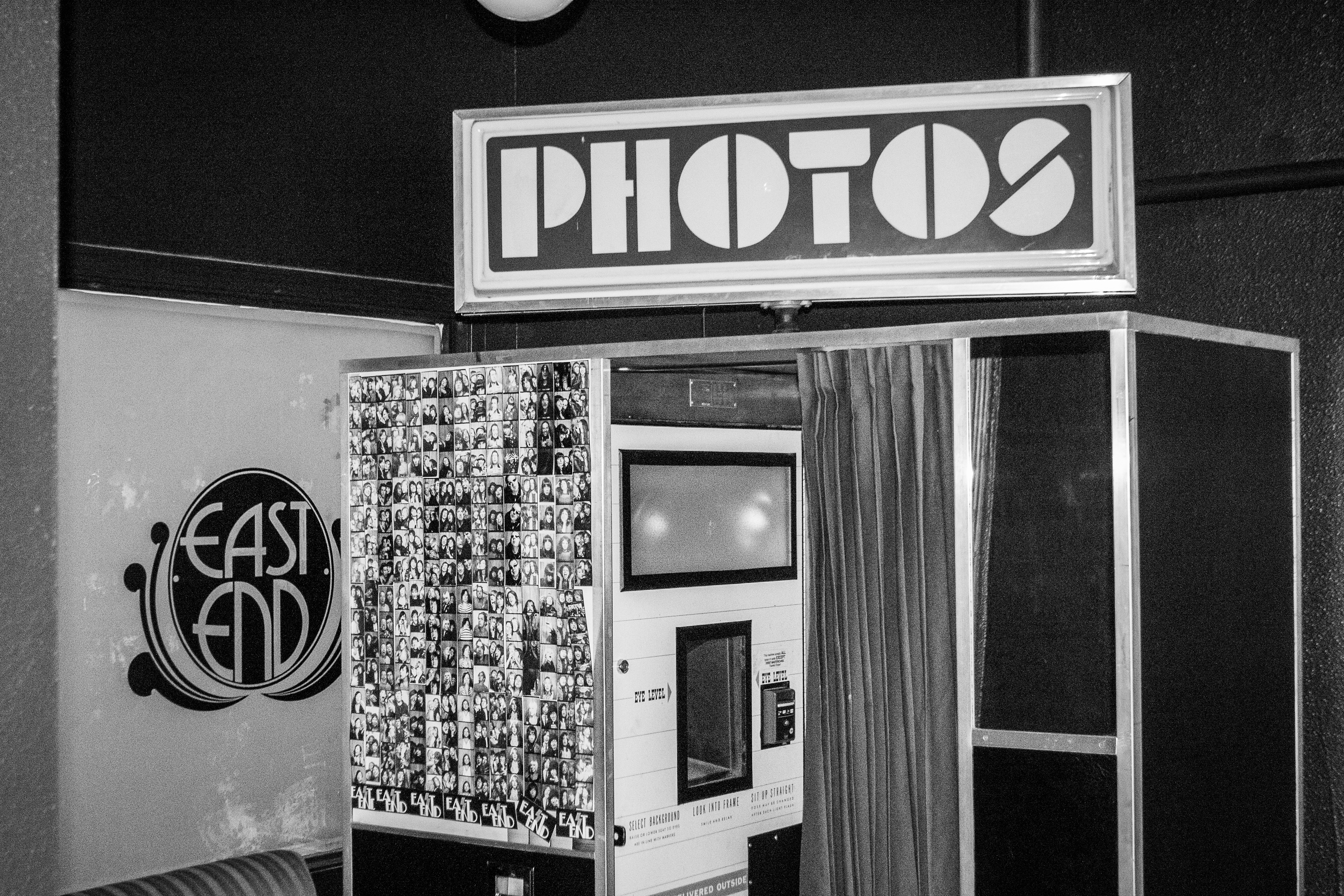
A photo booth at a hotel

A photo booth is a vending machine or modern kiosk that contains an automated, usually coin-operated, camera and film processor. Today, the vast majority of photo booths are digital. Traditionally, photo booths contain a seat or bench designed to seat the one or two patrons being photographed. The seat is typically surrounded by a curtain of some sort to allow for some privacy and help avoid outside interference during the photo session. Once the payment is made, the photo booth will take a series of photographs and the customer is then provided with prints. Older photo booth vending machines used film and involved the process of developing the film using liquid chemicals.

=== Stamp vending machine ===
A stamp vending machine is a mechanical, electrical or electro-mechanical device which can be used to automatically vend postage stamps to users in exchange for a pre-determined amount of money, normally in coin.

=== Ticket machines ===
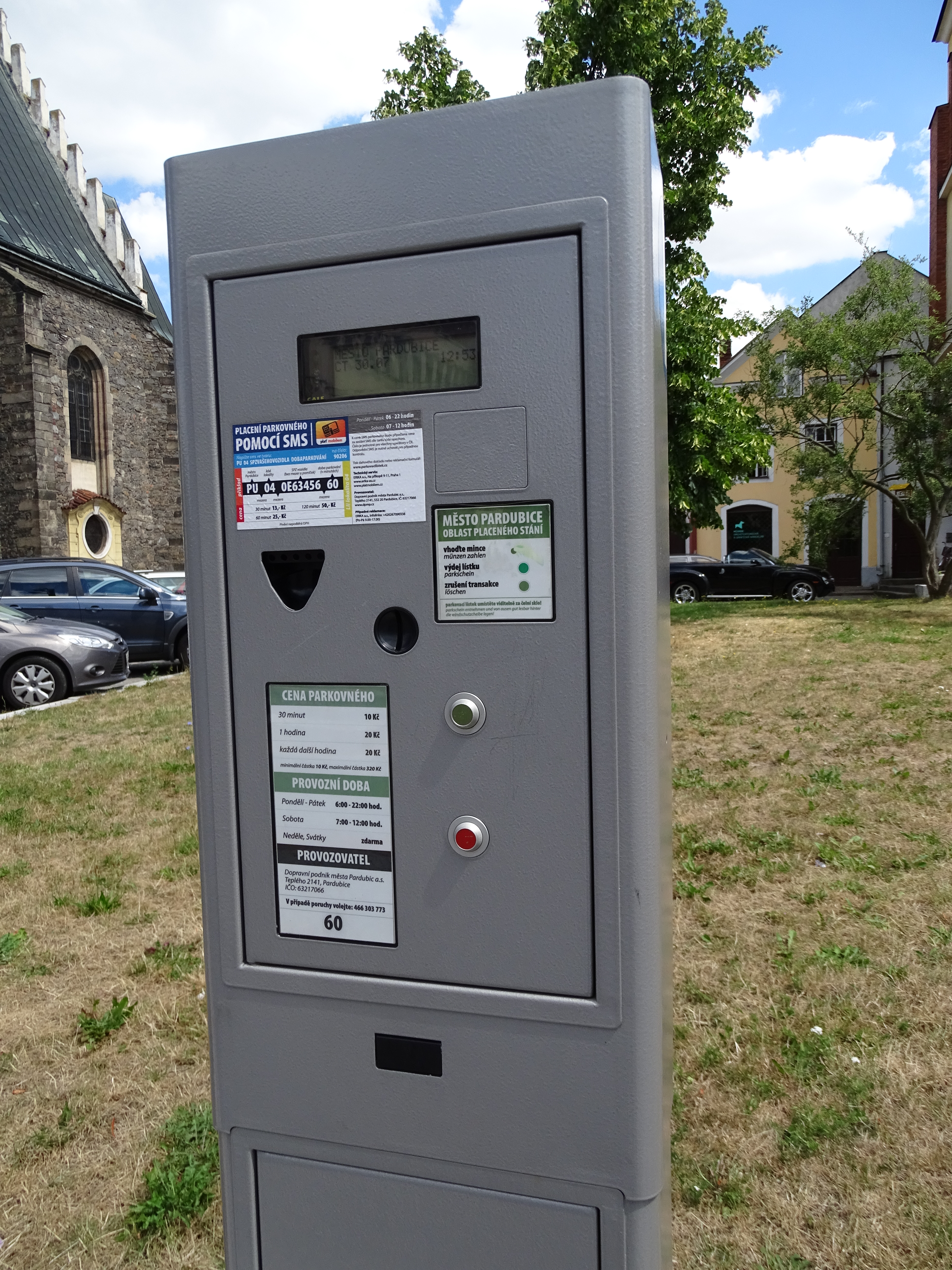
An automobile parking ticket machine in the Czech Republic

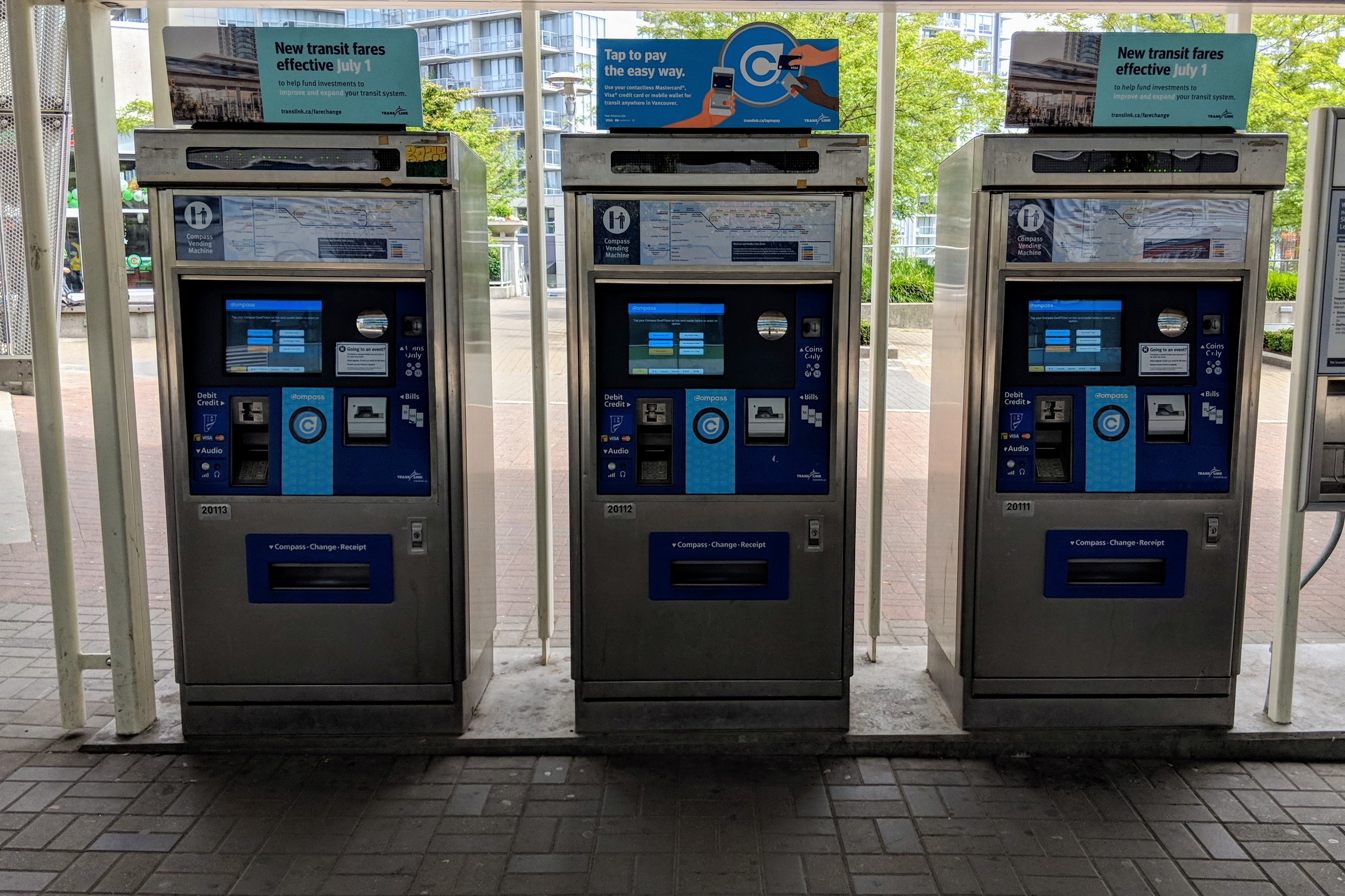
Ticket machines at a railway station in Metro Vancouver, Canada

A ticket machine is a vending machine that produces tickets. For instance, ticket machines dispense train tickets at railway stations, transit tickets at metro stations and tram tickets at some tram stops and in some trams. The typical transaction consists of a user using the display interface to select the type and quantity of tickets and then choosing a payment method of either cash, credit/debit card or smartcard. The ticket or tickets are then printed and dispensed to the user.

== Specialized vending machines ==
From 2000 to 2010, the specialization of vending machines became more common. Vending extended increasingly into non-traditional areas like electronics, or even artwork or short stories. Machines of this new category are generally called automated retail kiosks. When using an automated retail machine, consumers select products, sometimes using a touchscreen interface, pay for purchases using a credit or debit card and then the product is dispensed, sometimes via an internal robotic arm in the machine. The trend of specialization and proliferation of vending machines is perhaps most apparent in Japan where vending machines sell products from toilet paper to hot meals and pornography, and there is 1 vending machine per 23 people.

=== Ammunition vending machine ===
In 2024, a company called American Rounds began operating vending machines that sell firearm ammunition in grocery stores in the U.S. states of Alabama, Texas, Oklahoma, and Colorado. The machines use age-verification technology and facial recognition technology to make sure that buyers are at least 21 years old. Another company, called Master Ammo, operates similar machines that lack age-verification systems in gun clubs and gun ranges that have age requirements for entering.

=== Automobile vending machine ===
In November 2013, online auto retailer Carvana opened the first car vending machine in the U.S., located in Atlanta dispensing various models of used cars.

In late 2016, Autobahn Motors, a car dealership in Singapore, opened a 15-story-tall luxury car vending machine containing 60 cars, dispensing Ferrari and Lamborghini vehicles.

=== Bait vending machine ===
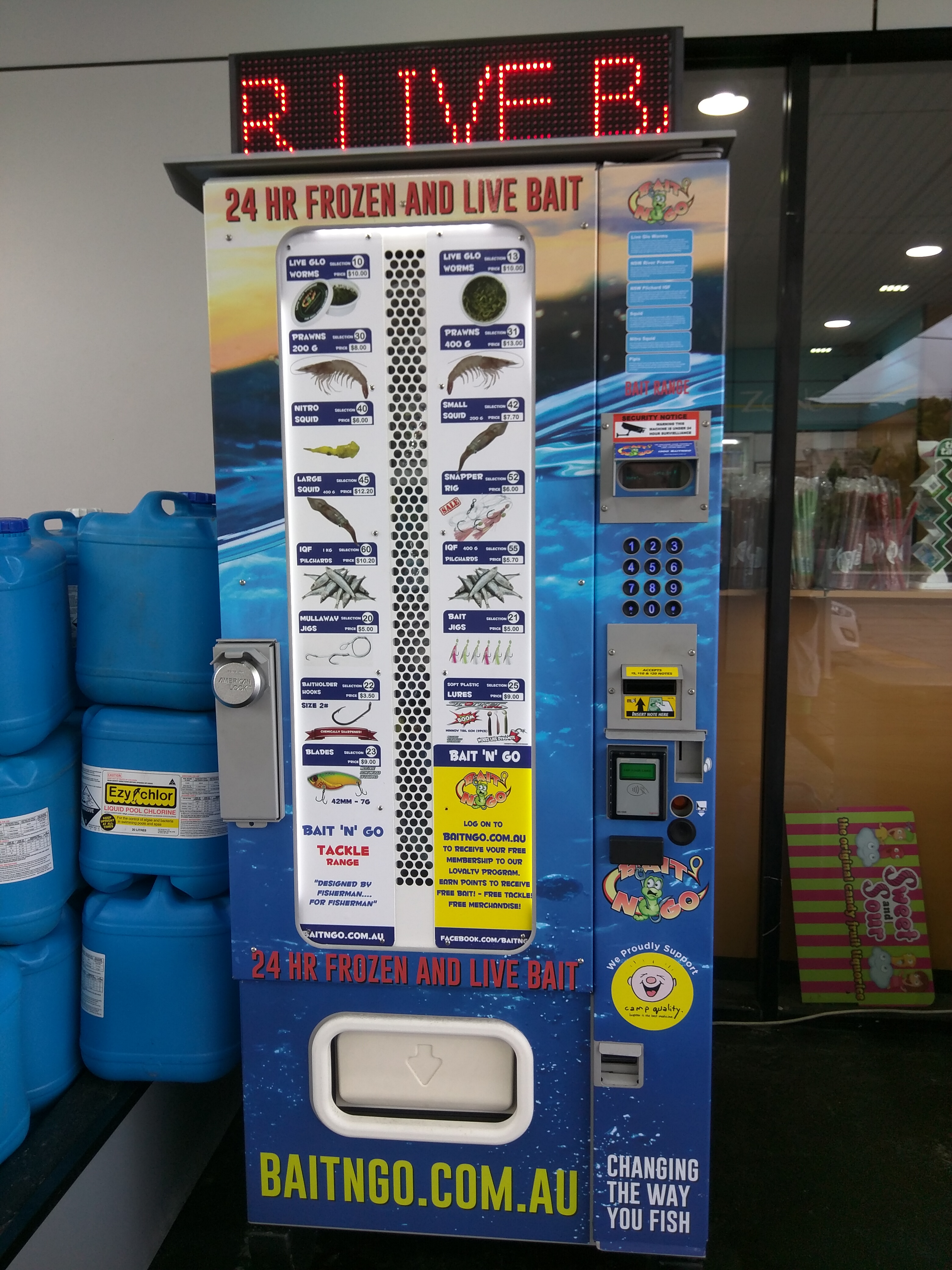
Fishing bait vending machine

A bait machine is a vending machine that dispenses live fishing bait, such as worms and crickets, for fishing.

=== Book vending machine ===
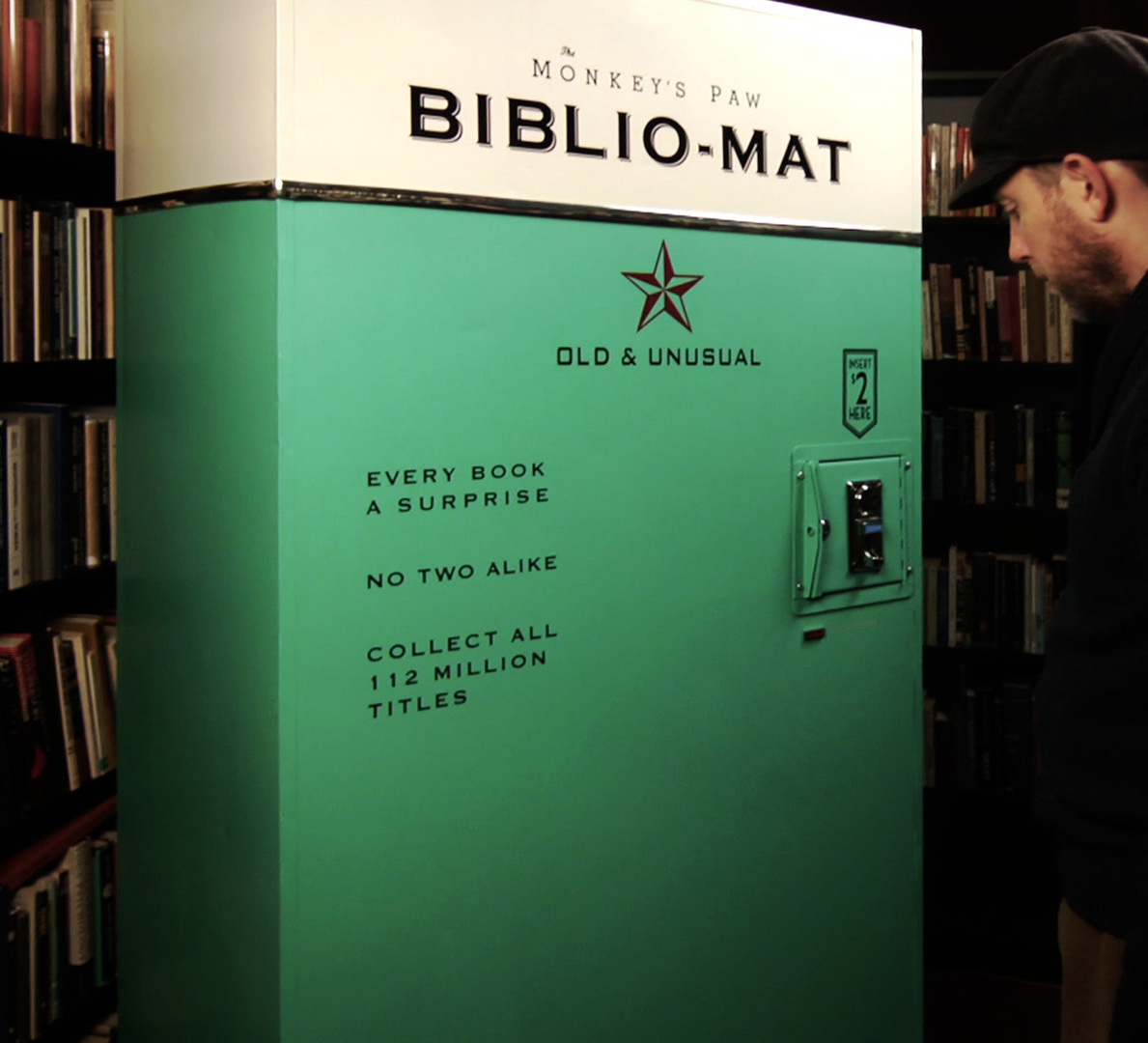
The Biblio-Mat book vending machine

Book vending machines dispense books, which may be full-sized. Some libraries use book vending machines. GoLibrary is a book lending vending machine used by libraries in Sweden and the U.S. state of California. The Biblio-Mat is a random antiquarian book vending machine located at The Monkey's Paw bookstore in Toronto, Canada.

=== Burger vending machine ===
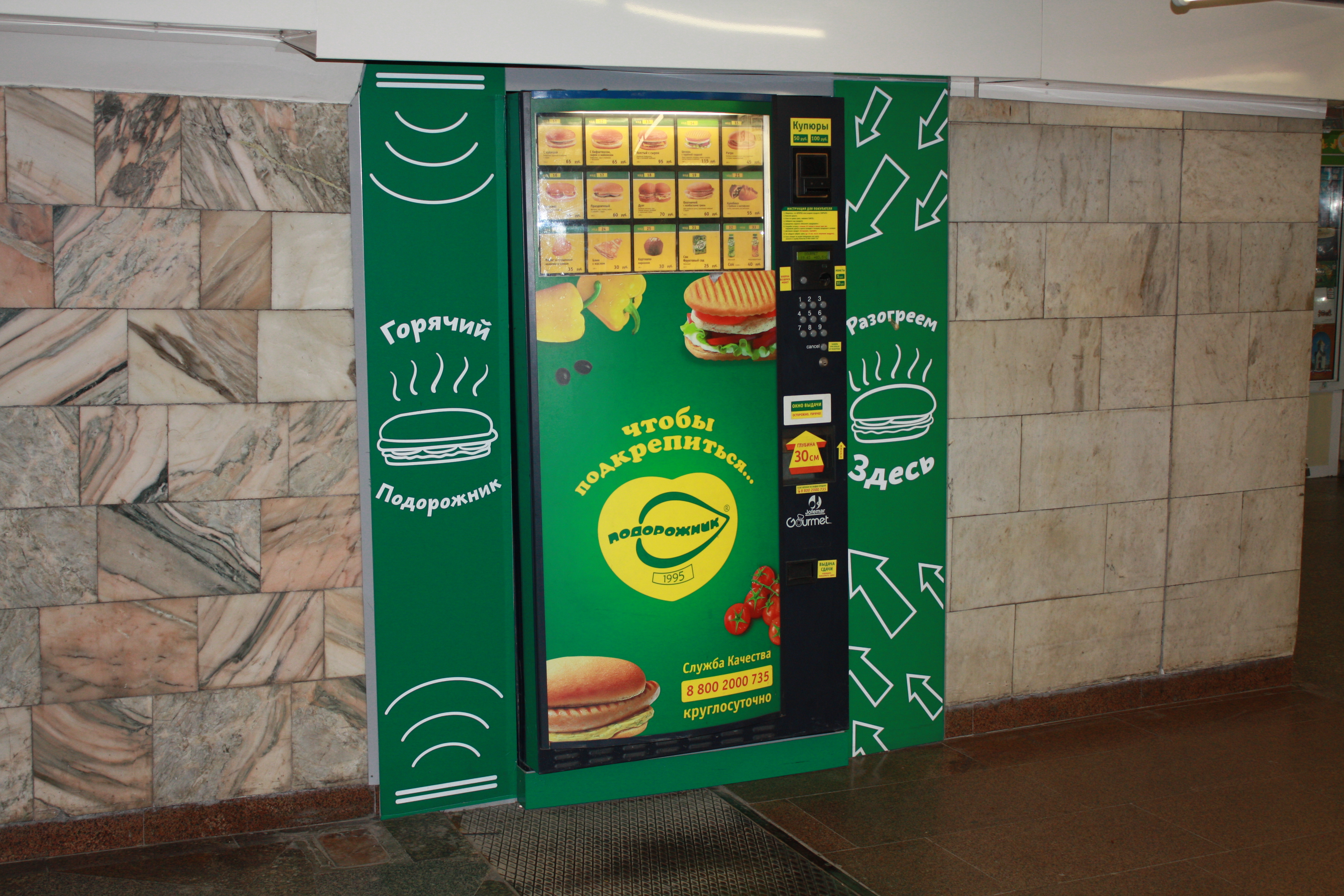
Burger vending machine in Novosibirsk Metro.

In 2022 RoboBurger introduced a machine to cook and vend a fresh hamburger.

=== Cotton candy vending machine ===
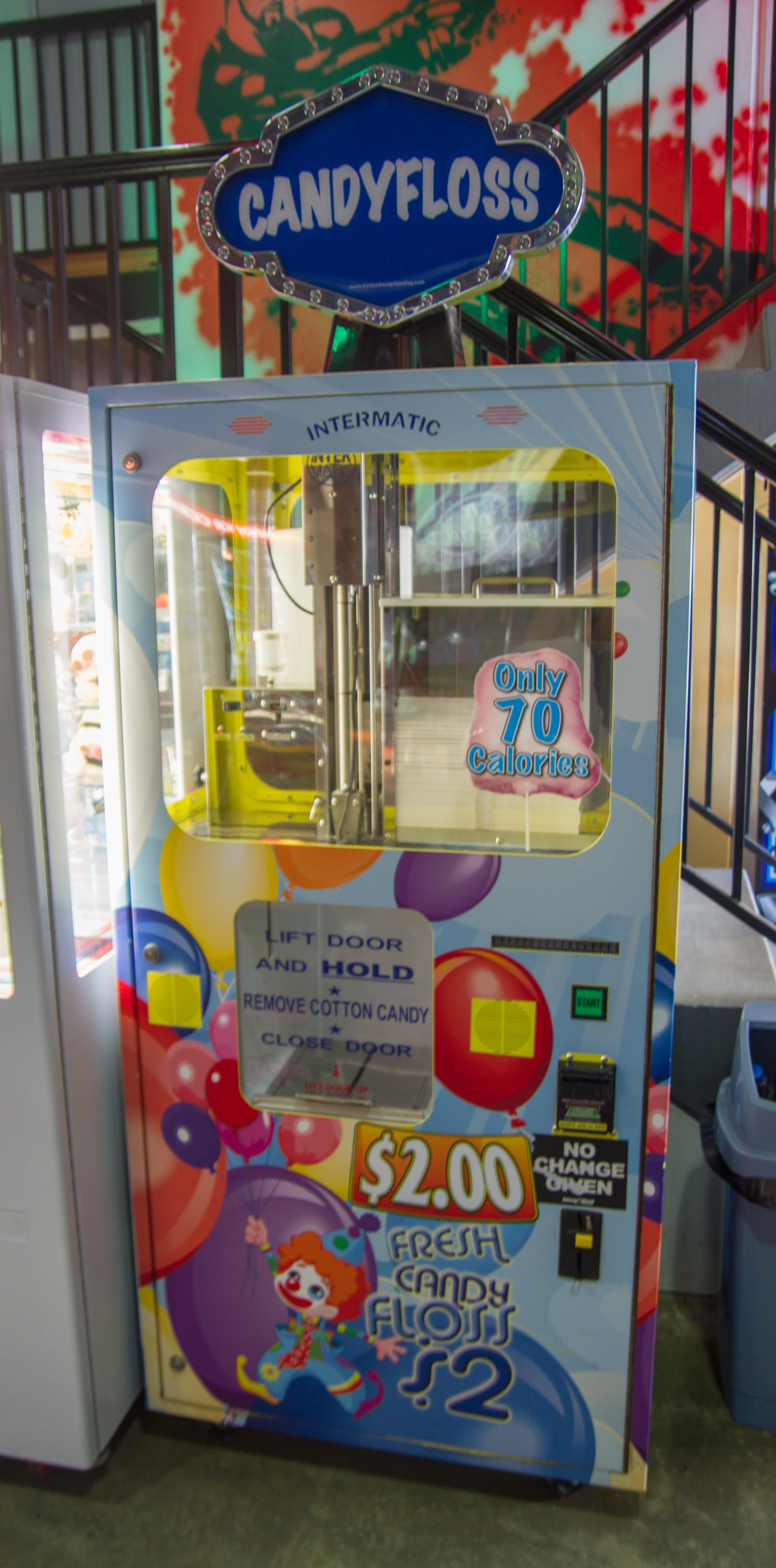
Cotton candy vending machine

The cotton candy vending machine is a vending machine that dispenses freshly spun cotton candy.

=== French fry vending machine ===
A French fry vending machine is a vending machine that dispenses hot French fries, also known as chips. The first known french fry vending machine was developed circa 1982 by the defunct Precision Fry Foods Pty Ltd. in Australia. A few companies have developed and manufactured French fry vending machines and prototypes. Furthermore, a prototype machine was also developed at Wageningen University in the Netherlands.

=== Fresh-squeezed orange juice ===
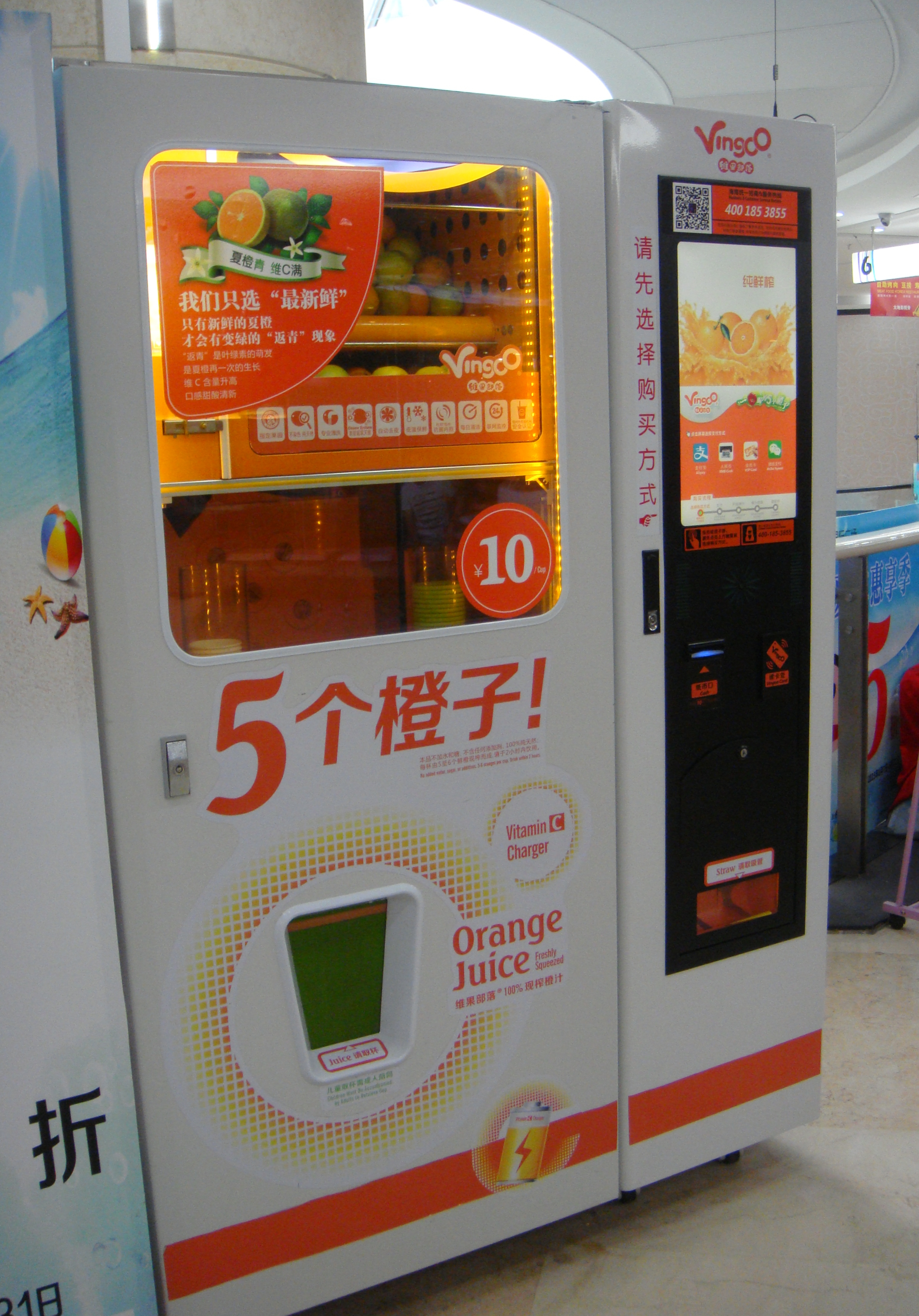
Orange juice vending machine

This type of machine contains fresh oranges and a mechanism to cut and squeeze them in order to produce fresh juice.

=== Life insurance ===
From the 1950s until the 1970s, vending machines were used at American airports to sell life insurance policies covering death, in case the buyer's flight crashed. However, this practice gradually disappeared due to the tendency of American courts to strictly construe such policies against their sellers, such as the Fidelity and Casualty Company of New York (which later became part of CNA Financial).

=== Marijuana vending machine ===
The marijuana vending machine originally found a niche market for selling or dispensing cannabis. In the early 21st century with legalization of cannabis in many countries, marijuana vending machines became widespread, selling products such as marijuana, hemp and CBD based products and smoke paraphernalia. The first experiments in distributing marijuana through vending machines started in the early 2010s, when they were already in use in the United States and Canada. The primary challenge faced in selling restricted or controlled merchandise like cannabis is to verify the identity of the buyer, which is overcome by the application of biometrics and smart vending software technology, the same technology used to verify the buyer's age in the automatic sales of tobacco.

=== Mold-A-Rama ===
The Mold-A-Rama is a brand name for a type of vending machine that makes blow-molded plastic figurines. Mold-A-Rama machines debuted in late 1962 and grew in prominence at the 1964 New York World's Fair. The machines can still be found operating in dozens of museums and zoos.

=== Pizza vending machine ===
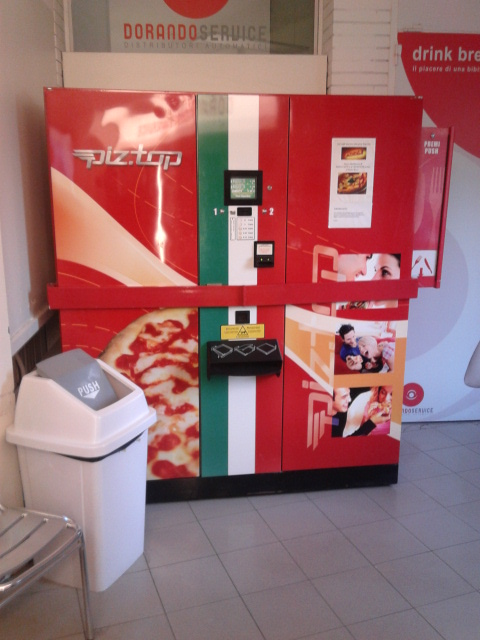
A vending machine in Carpi, Italy that dispenses hot pizza

Let's Pizza is the name of a vending machine that makes fresh pizza from scratch. It was developed in 2009 by Italian company Sitos srl. The machine combines water, flour, tomato sauce, and fresh ingredients to make a pizza in approximately three minutes. It includes windows so customers can watch the pizza as it is made. The pizza is cooked in an infrared oven. The device was invented by Claudio Torghele, an entrepreneur in Rovereto, Italy. The vending machine began in Italy and is now spreading into the United Kingdom and becoming popular there.

=== Prize vending machine ===
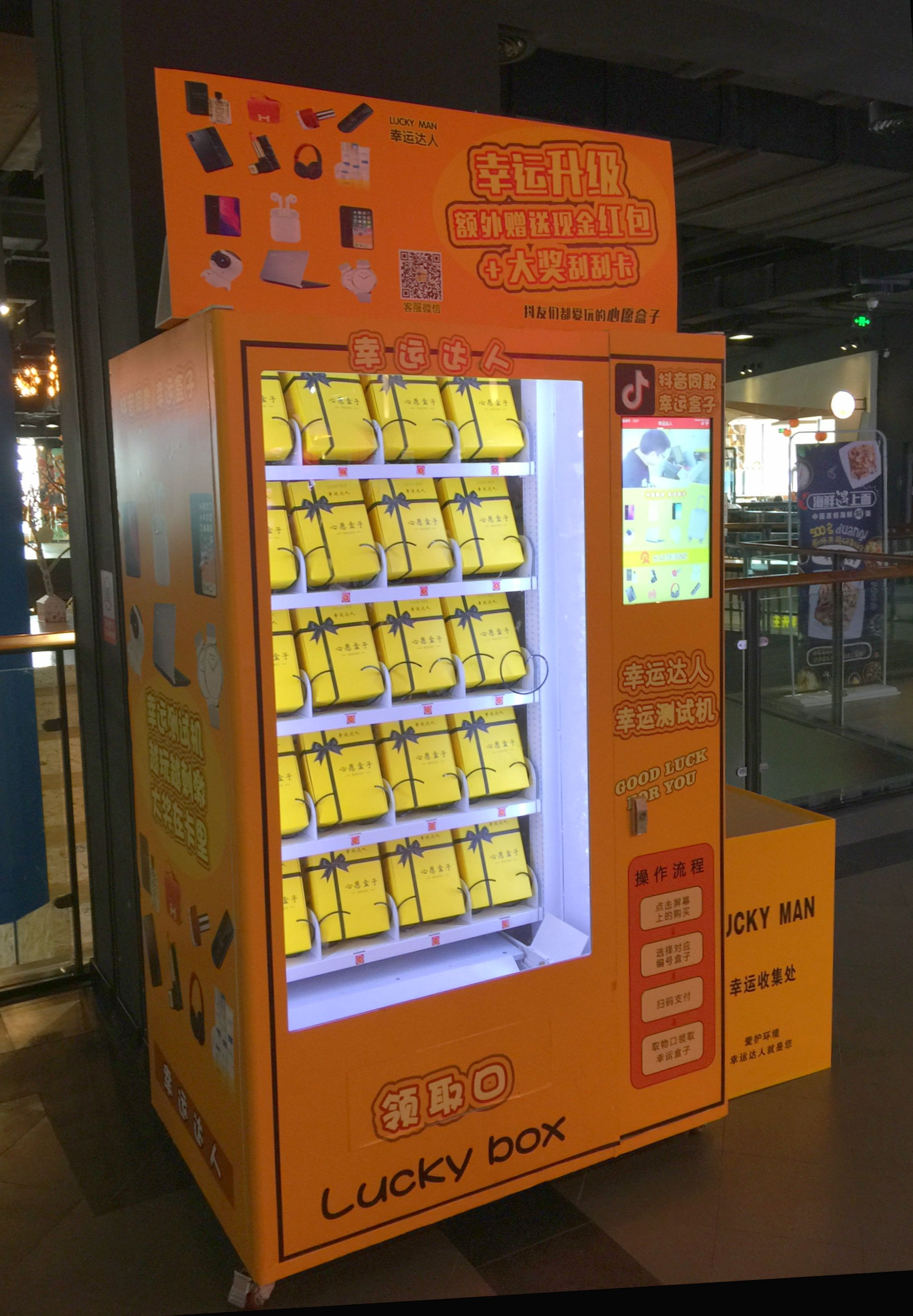
A prize vending machine in Haikou, Hainan, China

This type of machine sells a container that may contain a prize. Some such machines advertise the possible prizes that may be won. Examples include smart phones, holiday packages, and toys.

=== Social-networked vending machine ===
With the rise of the social networks, vending machine has been integrated to social media in order to proliferate the interaction of the vending machine with the users from the physical machine to the social networks. The common application of social-networked vending machine is that the user can connect their social account to a specific social media designated by the vending machine, the user will be getting some rewards in return, normally in the form of free gift dispensed from the vending machine.

=== Make-up vending machines ===
Vending machines are also being used by entrepreneurs to sell cosmetics to those on the go as an easy convenience.

=== Giving Machine ===
A Giving Machine is a specialized "reverse vending machine" that allows people to purchase donations for various nonprofits. They are placed in various public areas by the Church of Jesus Christ of Latter-day Saints during the Christmas and holiday season.

== Popularity in Japan ==
Vending machines are a common sight in Japan, and are considerably popular. There are more than 5.5 million machines installed throughout the nation, and Japan holds the highest ratio of machines per person for any country with one machine for every twenty-three people.

Regarding the development of advanced technology, Japanese vending machines provide more services by selling different kinds of products. Food, smartphones, SIM cards, and even clothing can be found in these machines. Apart from the most popular drink vending machines, Japanese vending machines also offer certain products depending on the demand and need for different locations. For example, products like sanitary napkins and tampons can be found in vending machines in female restrooms, while machines selling condoms are usually located in male restrooms.

Convenience, low cost of running, security, and stability seem to be the main reasons for Japan to invest in vending machines.

A patent for an "automatic goods vending machine" was filed in 1888 in Japan; early surviving vending machines from around the 1900s include one that dispenses stamps and postcards, and one that dispenses sake. Confectionery vending machines became widespread in the 1920s, and juice vending machines became popular in the late 1950s and 1960s. By 2000, the number of vending machines in Japan had grown to 5.6 million. However, from around the early 2000s, the number of vending machines in Japan decreased slightly to 5.03 million, and the sales amount also decreased gradually, in part due to the rise of digital technology and market competition. In recent years, attention has been drawn towards older machines, such as the collection of vintage vending machines installed at the Sagamihara Vending Machine Park.

The decline in the number of vending machines in Japan is exacerbated by inflation and labor shortages for restocking.

In 2024, it was reported that a sizeable portion of the vending machines in Japan would require updates to their acceptors in order to accept the new designs for the Japanese yen banknotes that were due to be released that year.

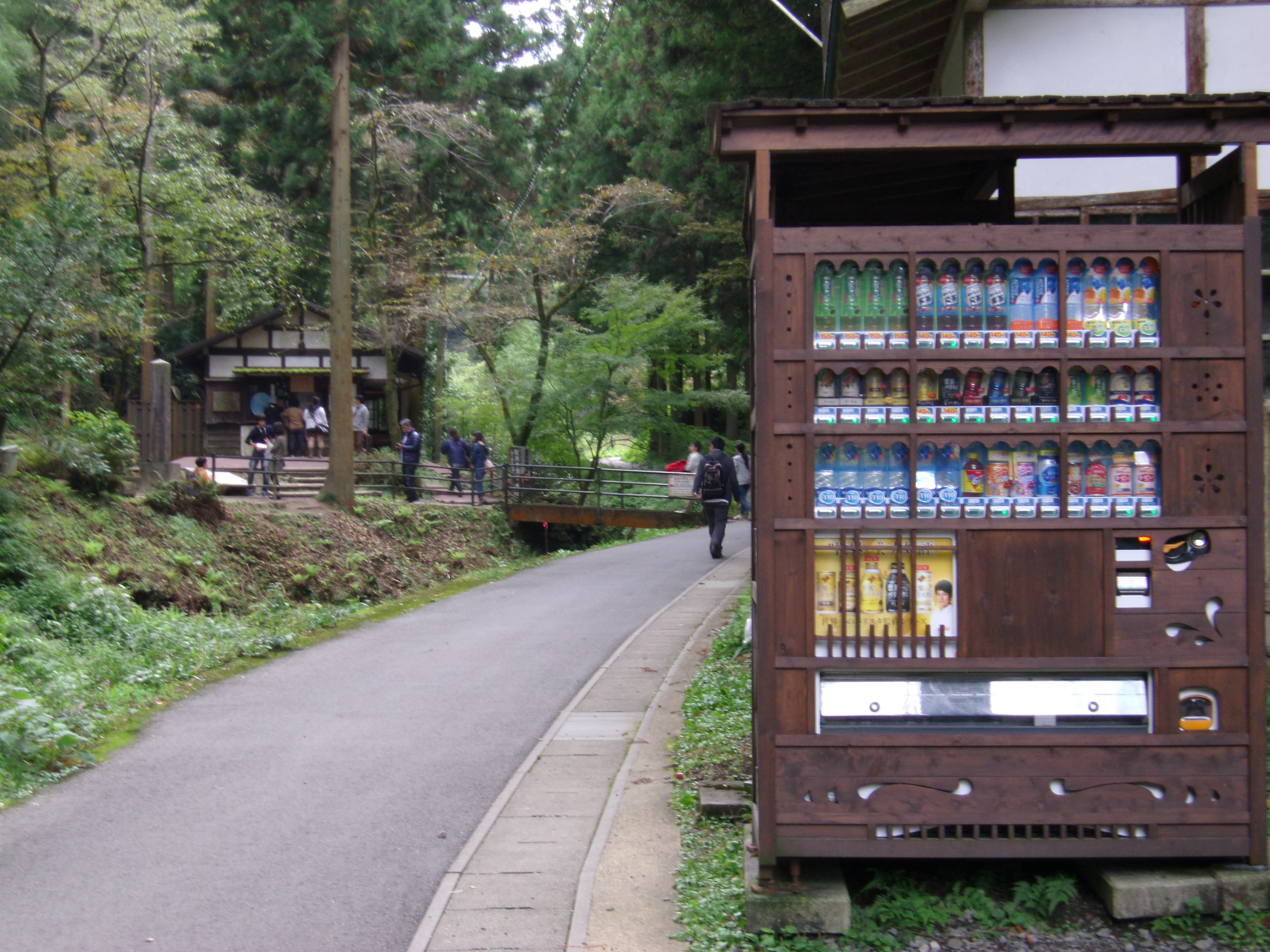
A vending machine with wooden cladding at Iwami Ginzan Silver Mine in Ōda, Shimane, Japan

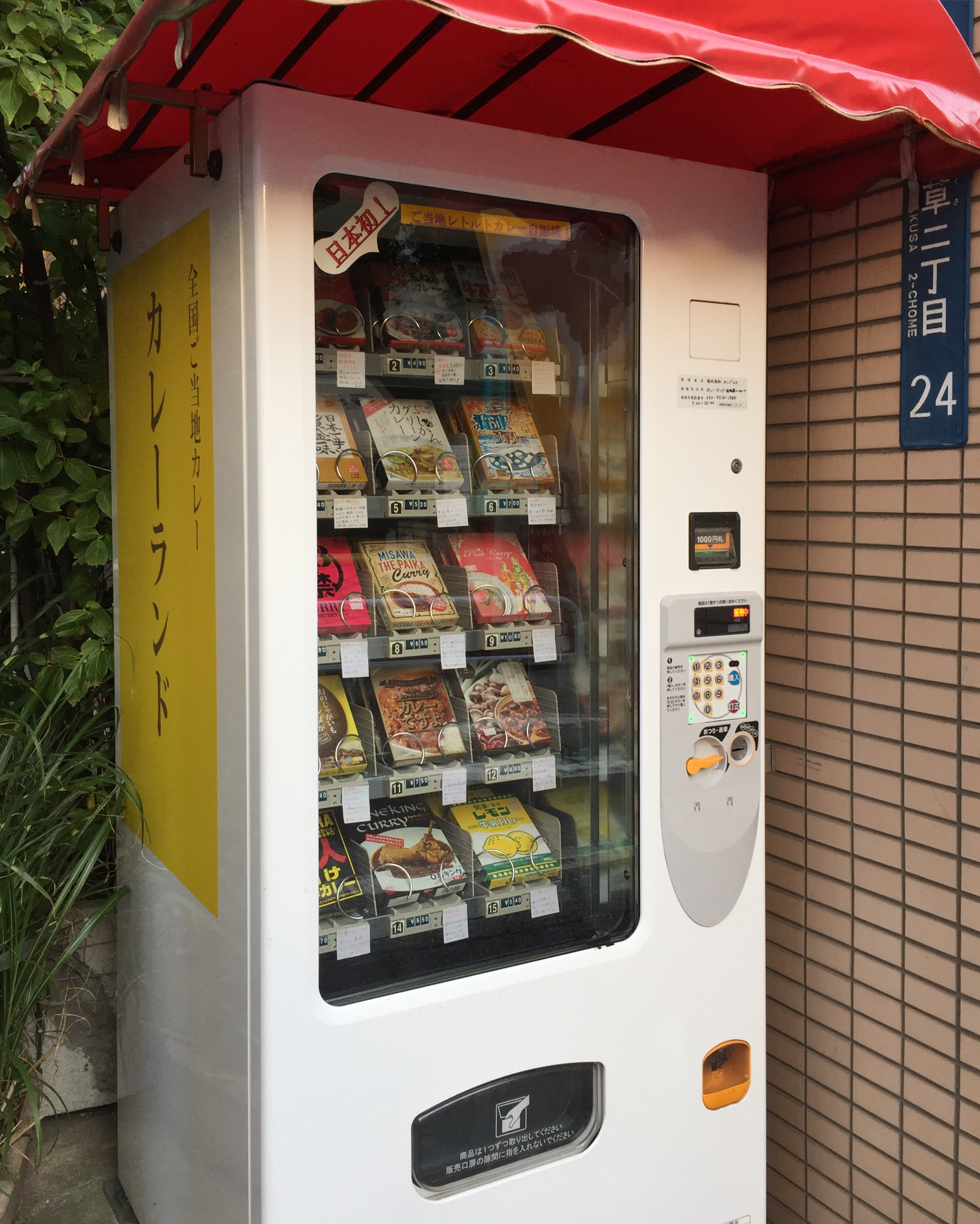
A vending machine of retort pouched curries at Asakusa, Japan

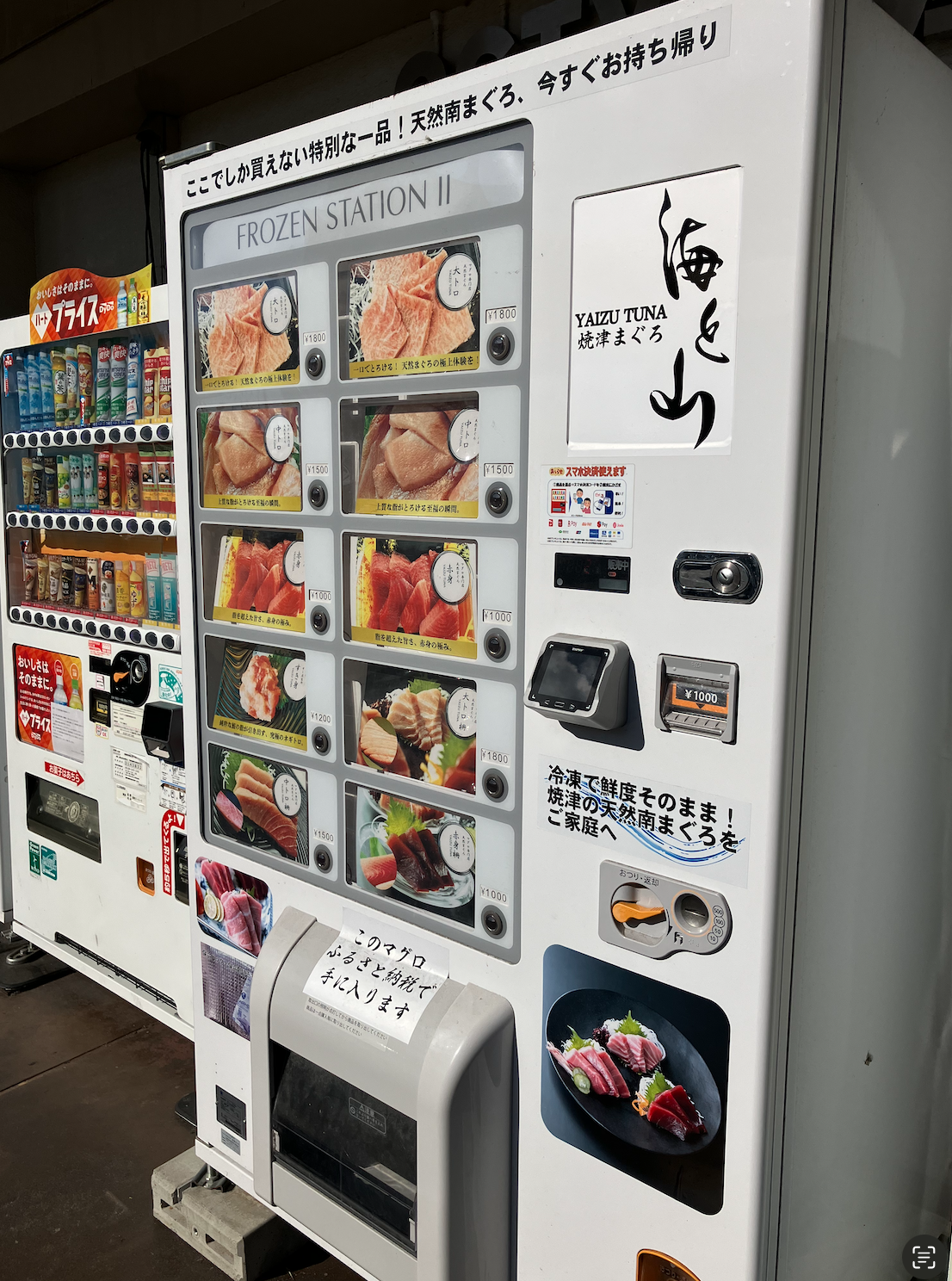
A vending machine for frozen tuna, in Yaizu, Shizuoka, Japan

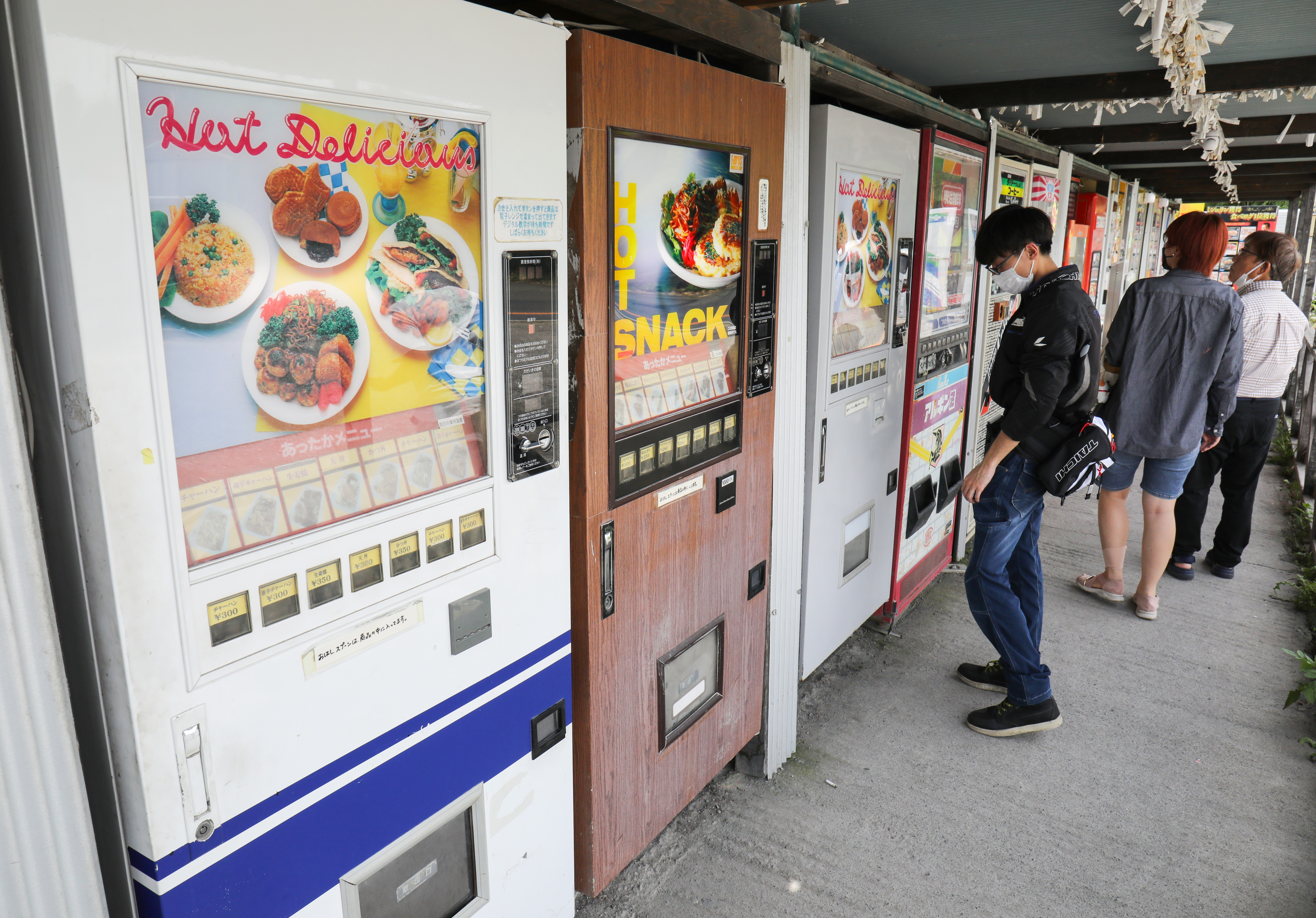
A line of vintage vending machines at the Sagamihara Vending Machine Park, Kanagawa, Japan

== Smart vending machines ==
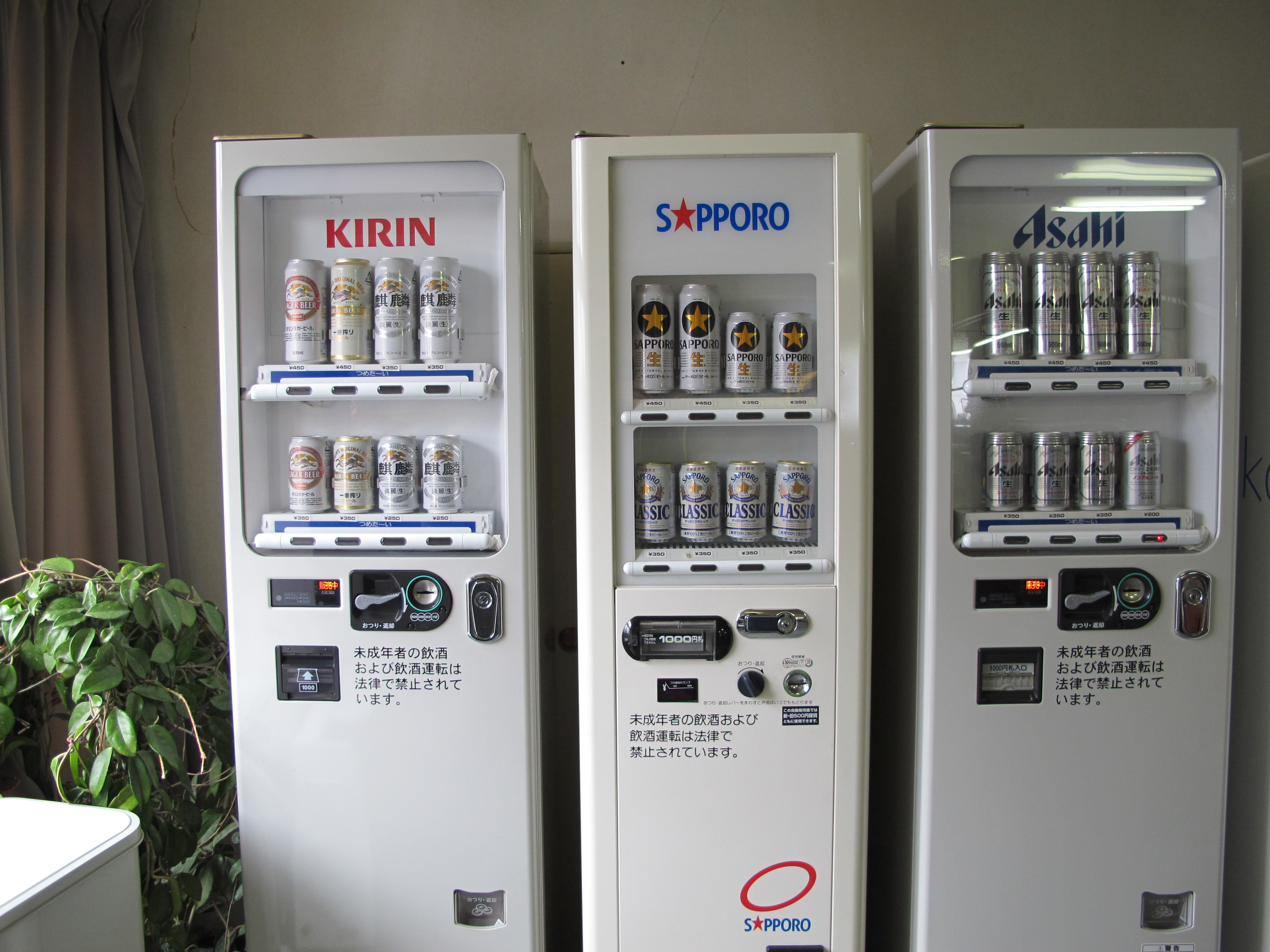
Beer vending machines at a Japanese Onsen

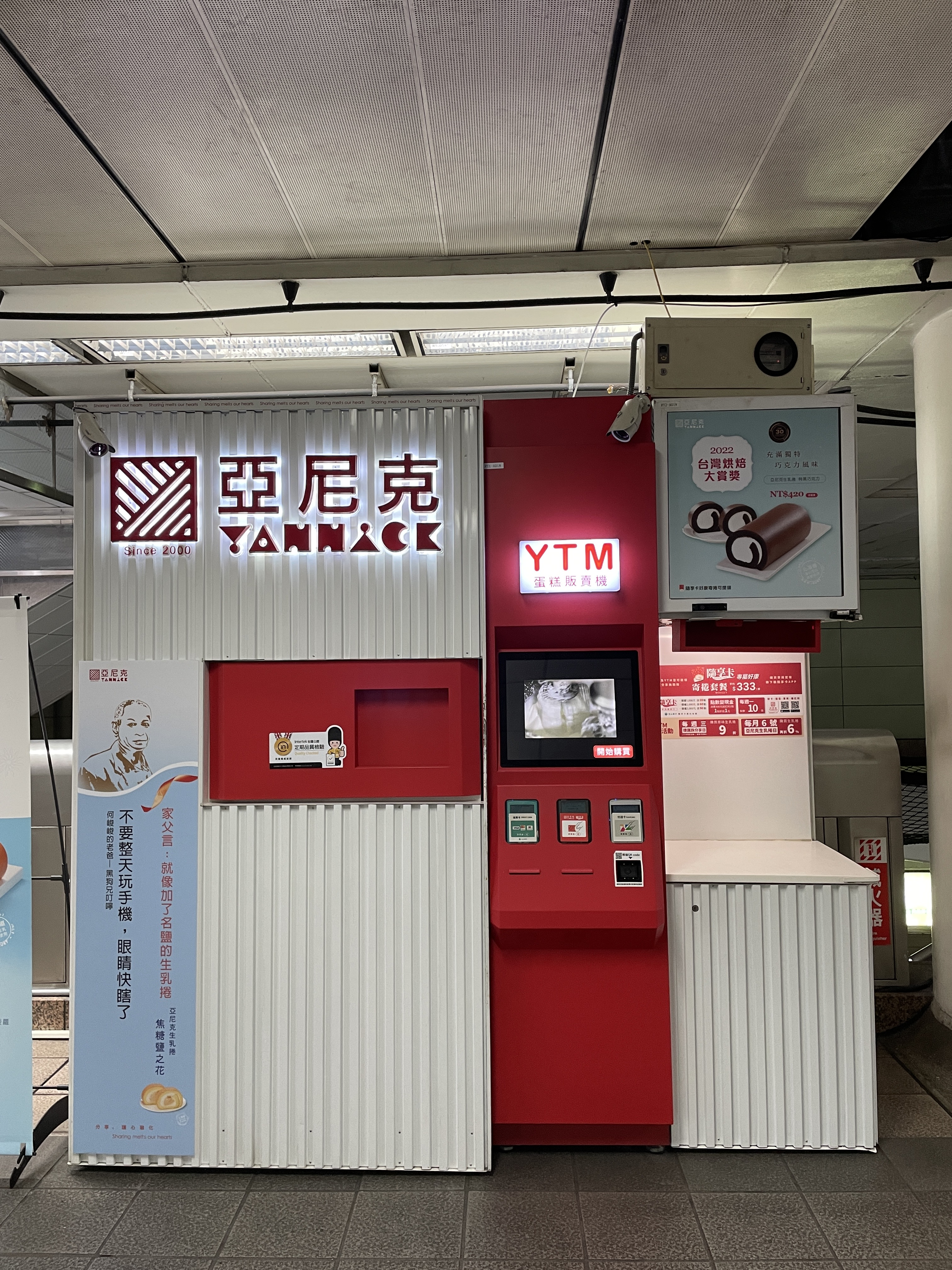
A Swiss roll vending machine in an MRT station in Taipei. The Swiss rolls are kept at 7 °C, orders are entered on a touchscreen, and payments are made through various contactless payment cards.

Similar to the development of traditional mobile phones into smartphones, vending machines have also progressively, though at a much slower pace, evolved into "smart" vending machines. Newer technologies at a lower cost of adoption, such as the large digital touch display, internet connectivity, deep learning and machine learning technologies, cameras and various types of sensors, more cost-effective embedded computing power, digital signage, various advanced payment systems, and a wide range of identification technology (NFC, RFID, etc.) have contributed to this development. These smart vending machines enable a more interactive user experience, and reduce operating costs while improving the efficiency of the vending operations through remote manageability and intelligent back-end analytic. Integrated sensors and cameras also represent a source of such data as customer demographics, purchase trends, and other locality-specific information. It also enables better customer-engagement for the brands through interactive multimedia and social media connectivity. Smart vending machines were No.79 by JWT Intelligence on its list of 100 Things to Watch in 2014. According to market research by Frost & Sullivan, global shipments of smart vending machines are forecasted to reach around 2 million units by 2018, and further to 3.6 million units by 2020 with penetration rate of 20.3 percent.

== In popular culture ==
- The Japanese light novel series and its manga/anime adaptations Reborn as a Vending Machine, I Now Wander the Dungeon follows a Japanese man who was crushed to death by a vending machine reincarnated as one by the name of Boxxo.
- There are four vending machine characters in Matt Groening's 1999 animated comedy series, Futurama, with the most notable character, Bev (voiced by Wanda Sykes) who was impregnated by Bender Bending Rodriguez in the first episode of the seventh season, "The Bots and the Bees".

== See also ==
- Automat – a fast food restaurant where simple foods and drink are served by vending machines
- Arcade game
- Automated charging machine
- Automated retail
- Automated teller machine
- BreakMate
- Capitol Hill's mystery soda machine
- ChargeBox
- Charging station
- Coffee vending machine
- Death by vending machine
- Eu'Vend – a vending industry trade show
- Fortune teller machine
- Freedom Toaster
- Gashapon
- Gold to Go
- Gumball machine
- Interactive kiosk
- Jukebox
- Kiddie ride
- Love tester machine
- Parking meter
- Pinball machine
- Reverse vending machine
- Self-service
- Slot machine
- Slug (coin)
- Stamp vending machines in the United Kingdom
- Strength tester machine
- Telephone booth
- Ticket machine
- Tower viewer
- Types of retail outlets
- Vending Times – a trade magazine focusing on the U.S. vending industry
- Washing machine
- Water cooler
