= Bait machine =

Machine that dispenses live fishing bait

A bait machine is a vending machine that dispenses live bait, such as worms and crickets, for fishing. In the case of worms, it may be called a worm machine.

== Overview ==
Red or manure worms are kept in stock within a growing medium, and oftentimes the machines have a small reservoir in them to simulate rain and to feed the worms a nutrient solution. Electrical pulses are used to encourage the worms to come closer to the surface to obtain the nutrient solution. In connection with heating and constant high humidity, worms attain higher reproduction rates and faster growth.

== Gallery ==
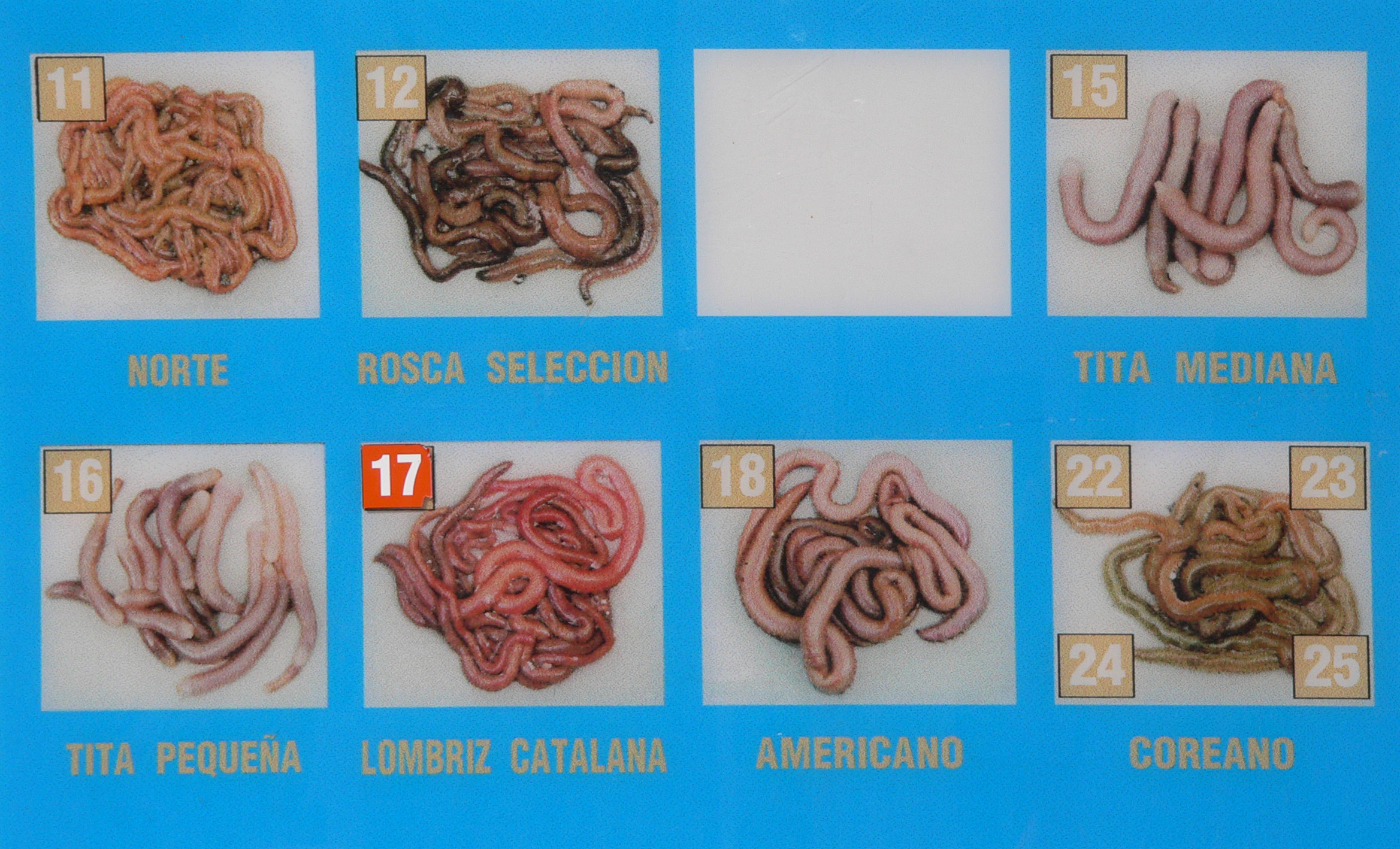
Display of products in the machine

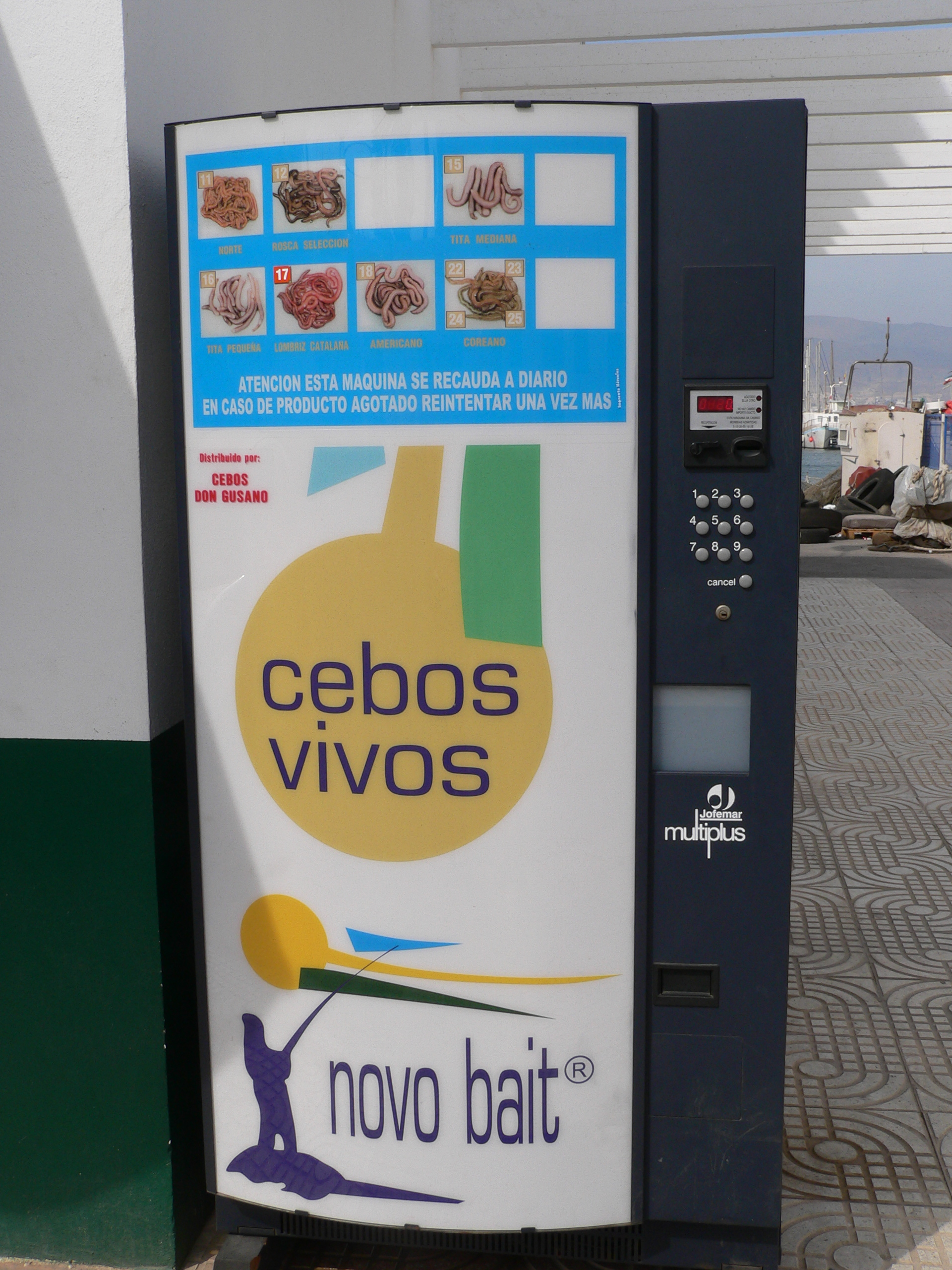
A worm machine in the port of Roquetas de Mar, Spain

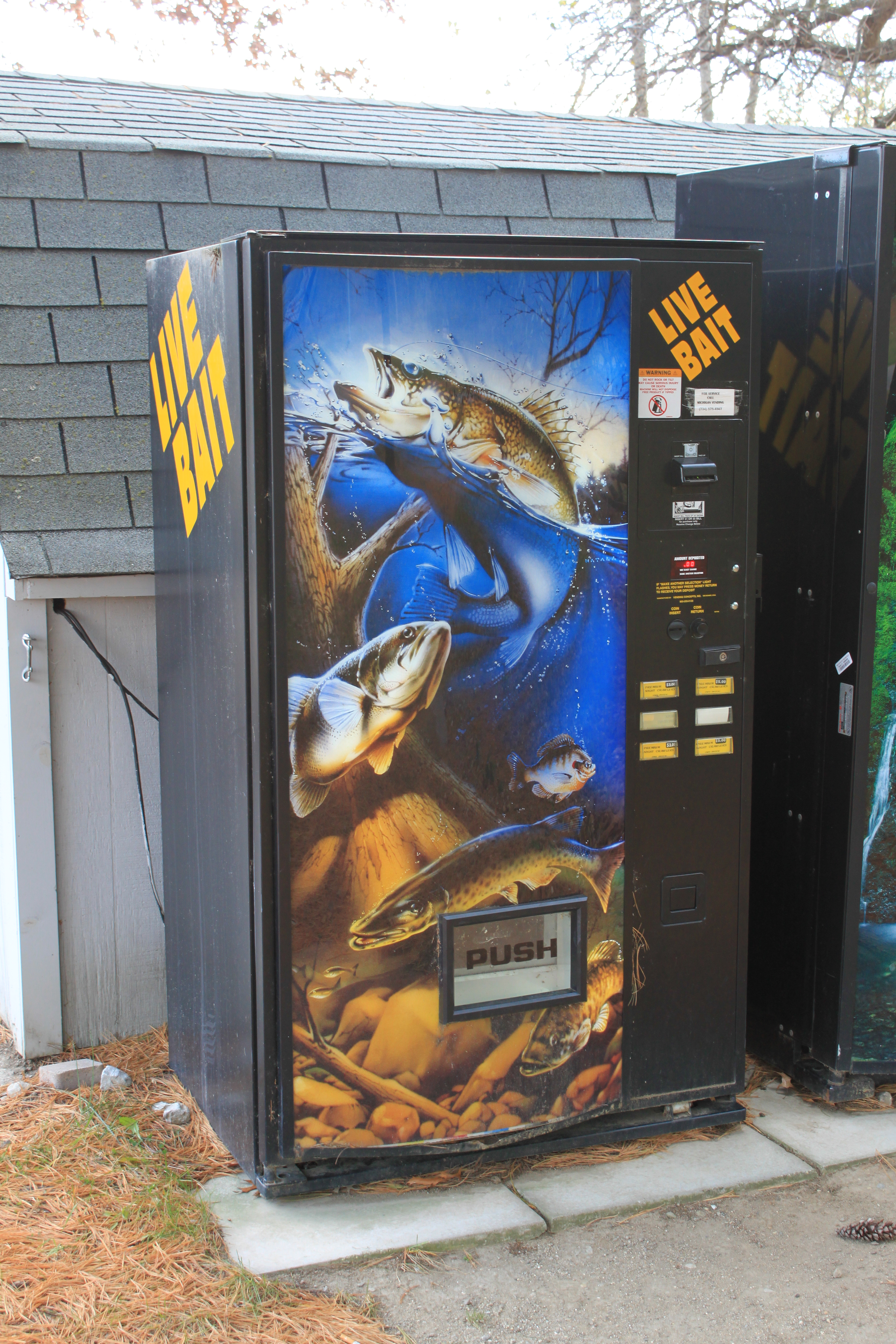
Live bait vending machine, Brighton Recreation Area, Michigan

== See also ==
- Baiting needle
