= Sagamihara Vending Machine Park =

Coordinates: 35.5426507°N 139.3817°E

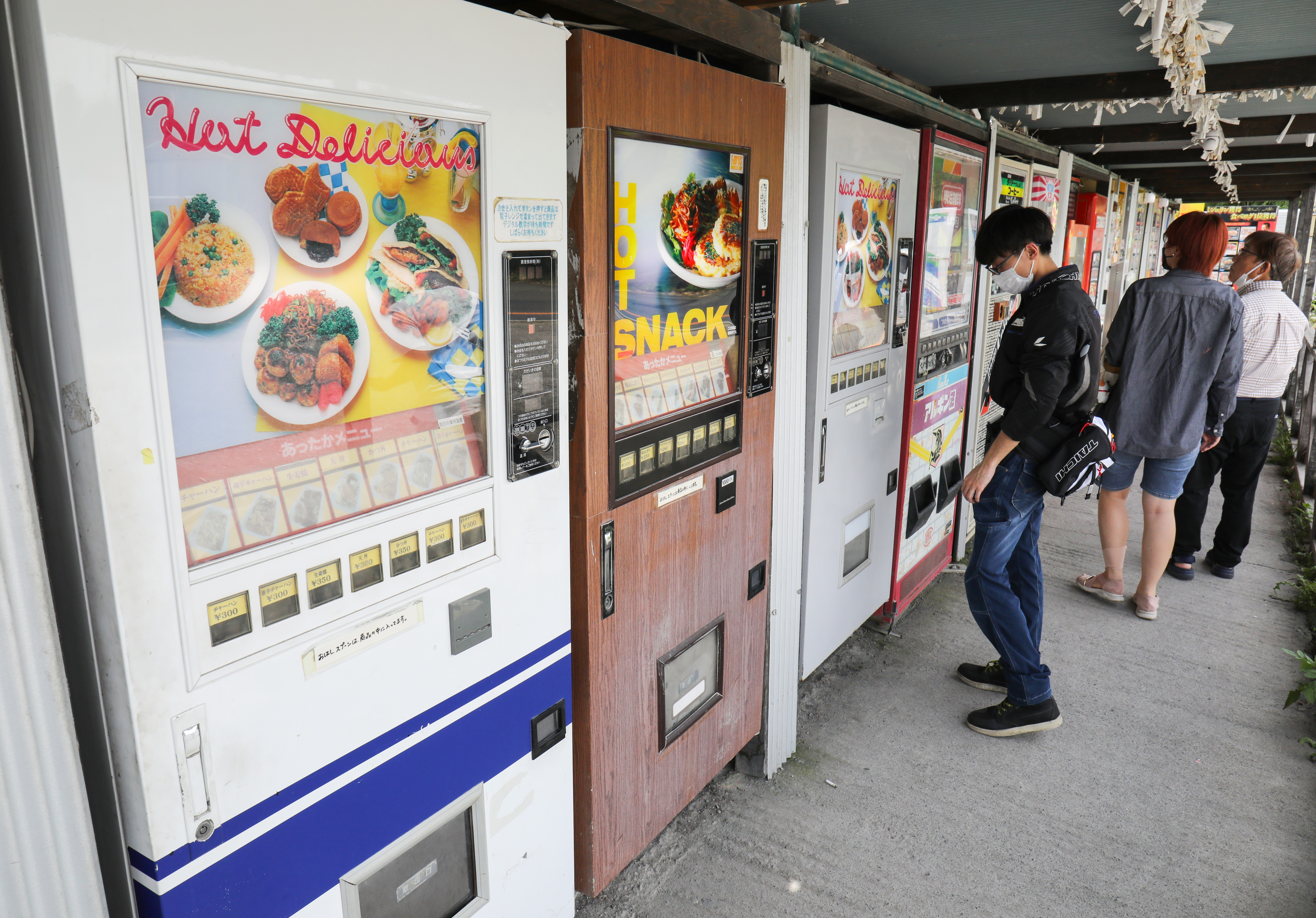
Vending machines offering hot food

The Sagamihara Vending Machine Park (相模原レトロ自販機, Sagamihara Retoro Jihanki) is a collection of retro vending machines in the city of Sagamihara in Kanagawa, Japan. It was created by Tatsuhiro Saitō (齋藤辰洋, Saitō Tatsuhiro), the president of the Rat Sunrise used tire shop, originally to entertain waiting customers. It has over 100 machines in two rows adjacent to the shop's parking lot. There is also a small room near the shop's office that contains classic arcade games. All of the vending machines are functional and dispense goods ranging from food, such as ramen, and drinks, to toys and fortune slips. The machines are restocked daily, with hot food for some of the machines cooked on site, and others prepared by vendors. While the tire shop has regular business hours, the vending machines are available around the clock.

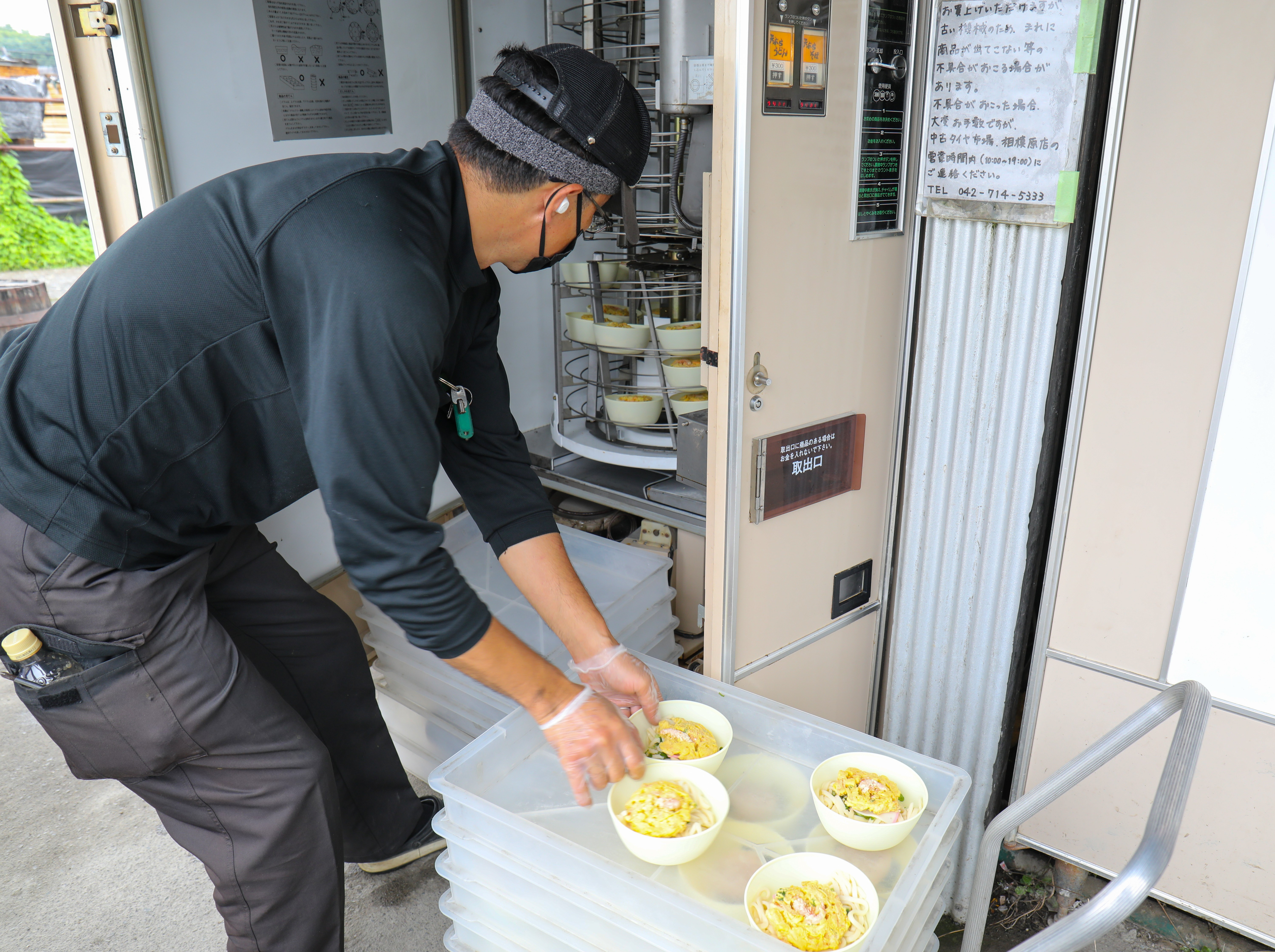
A vendor restocking udon

Saitō started the collection in 2016 with five machines, expanding it after it turned out to be popular with customers. He obtained and purchased machines for the collection through online auctions and word of mouth. A majority of the machines are from the 1970s and 1980s, the end of Japan's Shōwa era. Saitō makes the machines functional and maintains them himself, since they are no longer supported by their manufacturers. In September 2021, a button on one of the machines was broken by a vandal, and a plastic parts manufacturer created a replacement for free using CAD.

The collection is more time-consuming than the tire shop, and Saitō has as many employees to restock and cook for the machines as his shop. The kitchen makes more than 600 meals a day. In 2022, Saitō estimated that the collection drew 300–400 customers a day on weekdays and 1,000 customers on weekends. The collection is considered a "pilgrimage site" for fans of retro vending machines.
