= BreakMate =

Soda fountain machine

The BreakMate was a three-flavor soda fountain for The Coca-Cola Company developed in the 1980s in conjunction with BSH Bosch und Siemens Hausgeräte. Its compartment held three one-liter plastic containers of syrup and a CO_{2} tank, which mixed the water and syrup into a 5:1 ratio, with a reservoir for water for storage if water was not accessible for the machine. Designed for offices of between 5-50 employees, the machine was deemed a commercial flop due to unforeseen complications in cost and parts. In 2007, Coca-Cola stopped supplying parts, and in 2010 the company finally stopped supplying syrup for the machines.
