= List of cooking appliances =

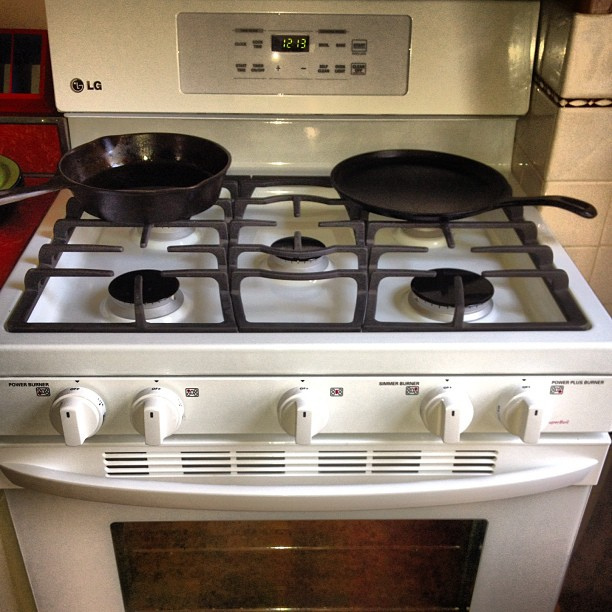
A gas-operated oven/stove combination

This is a list of cooking appliances that are used for cooking foods.

== Cooking appliances ==
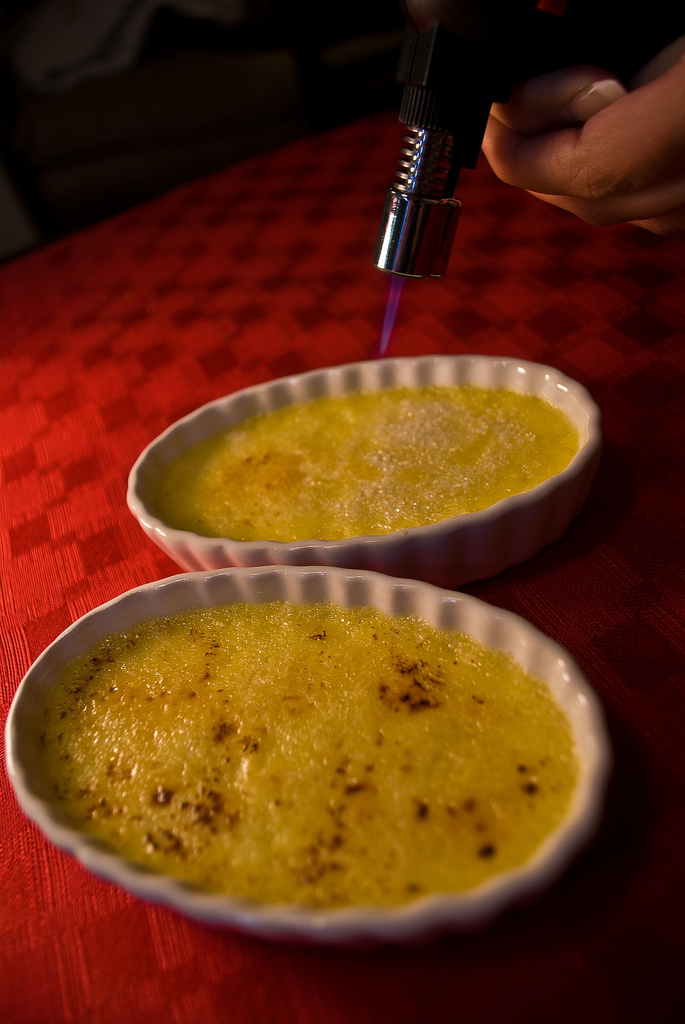
Using a caramelizer

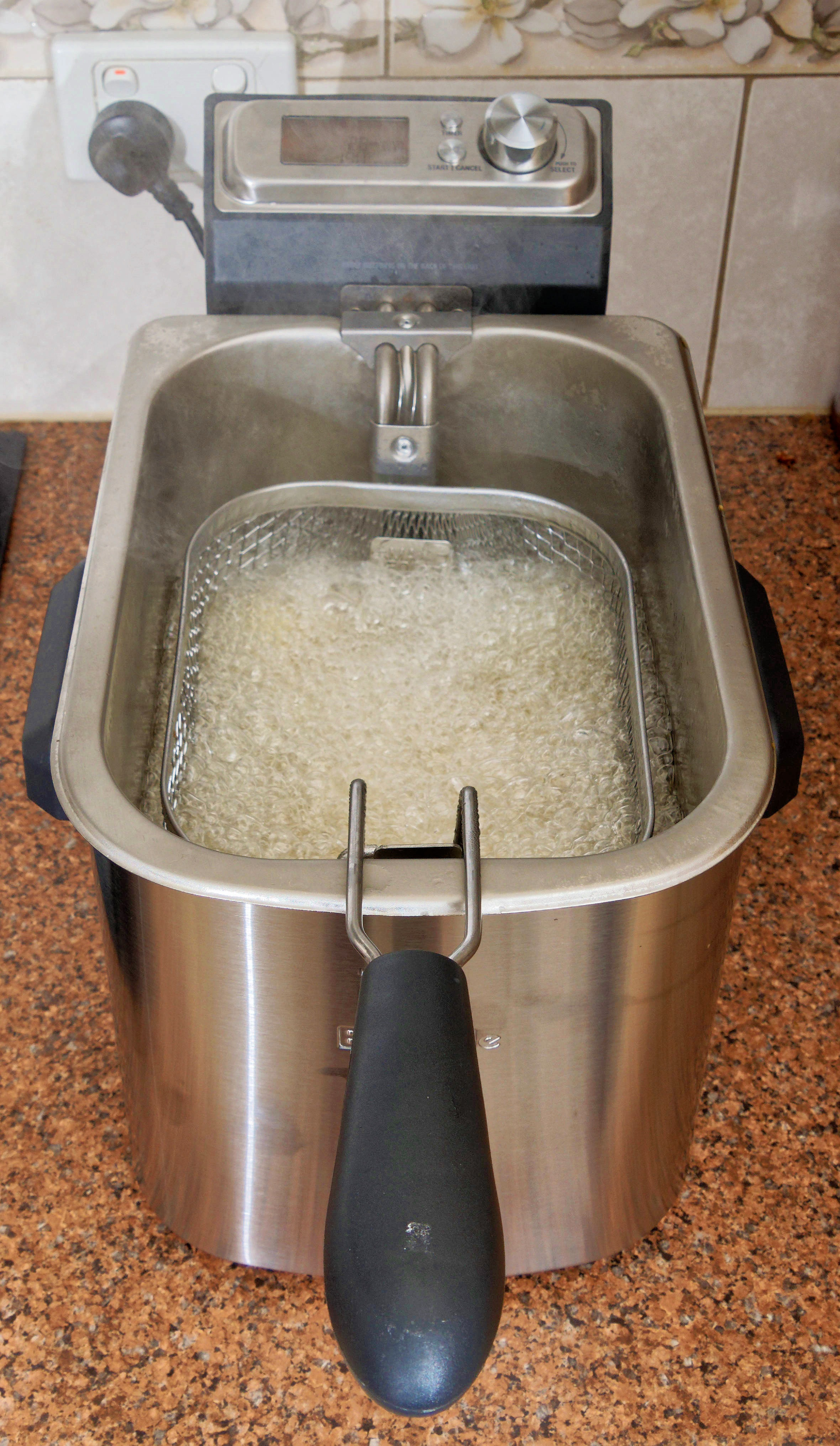
A domestic deep fryer in operation

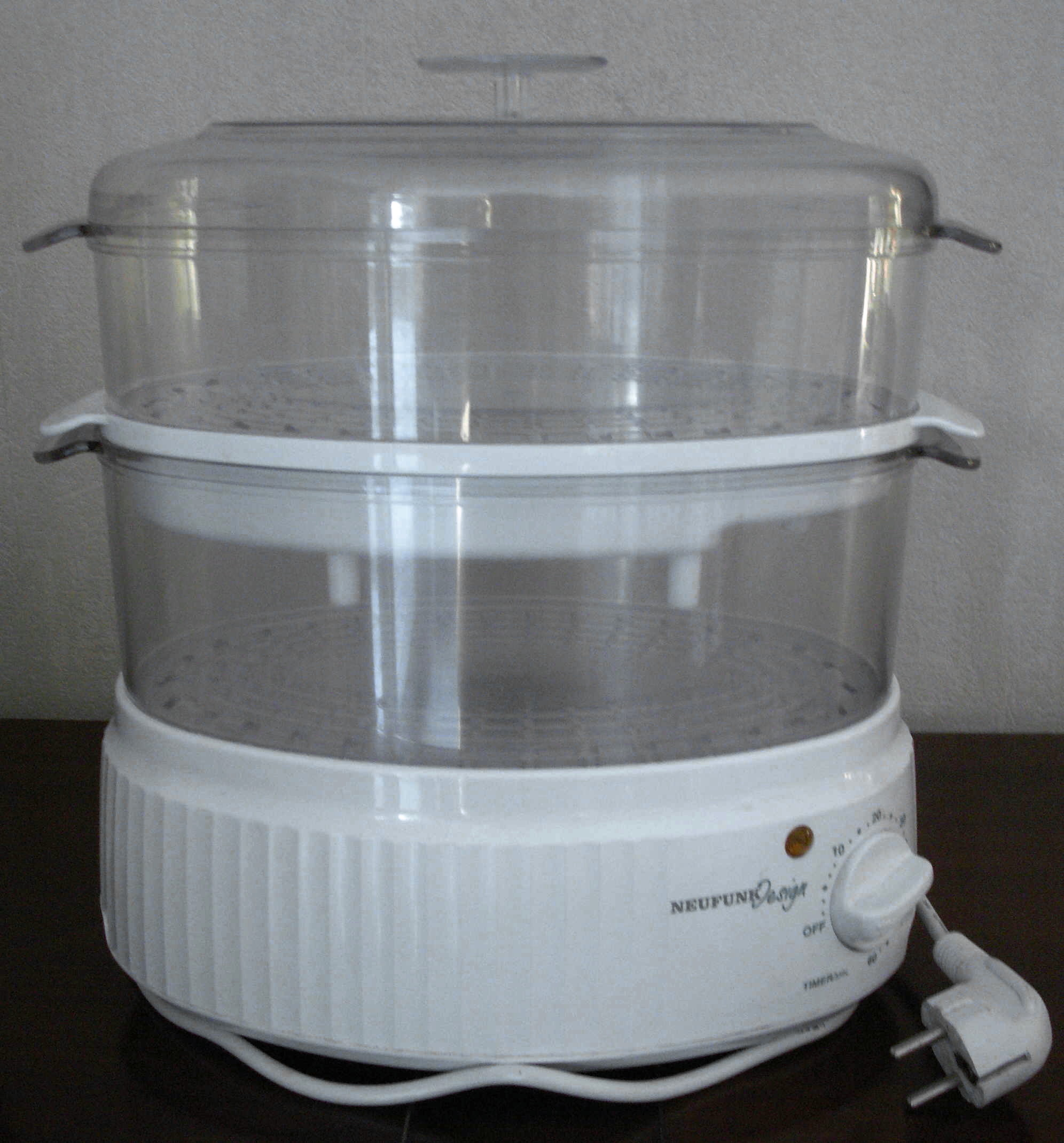
An electric food steamer

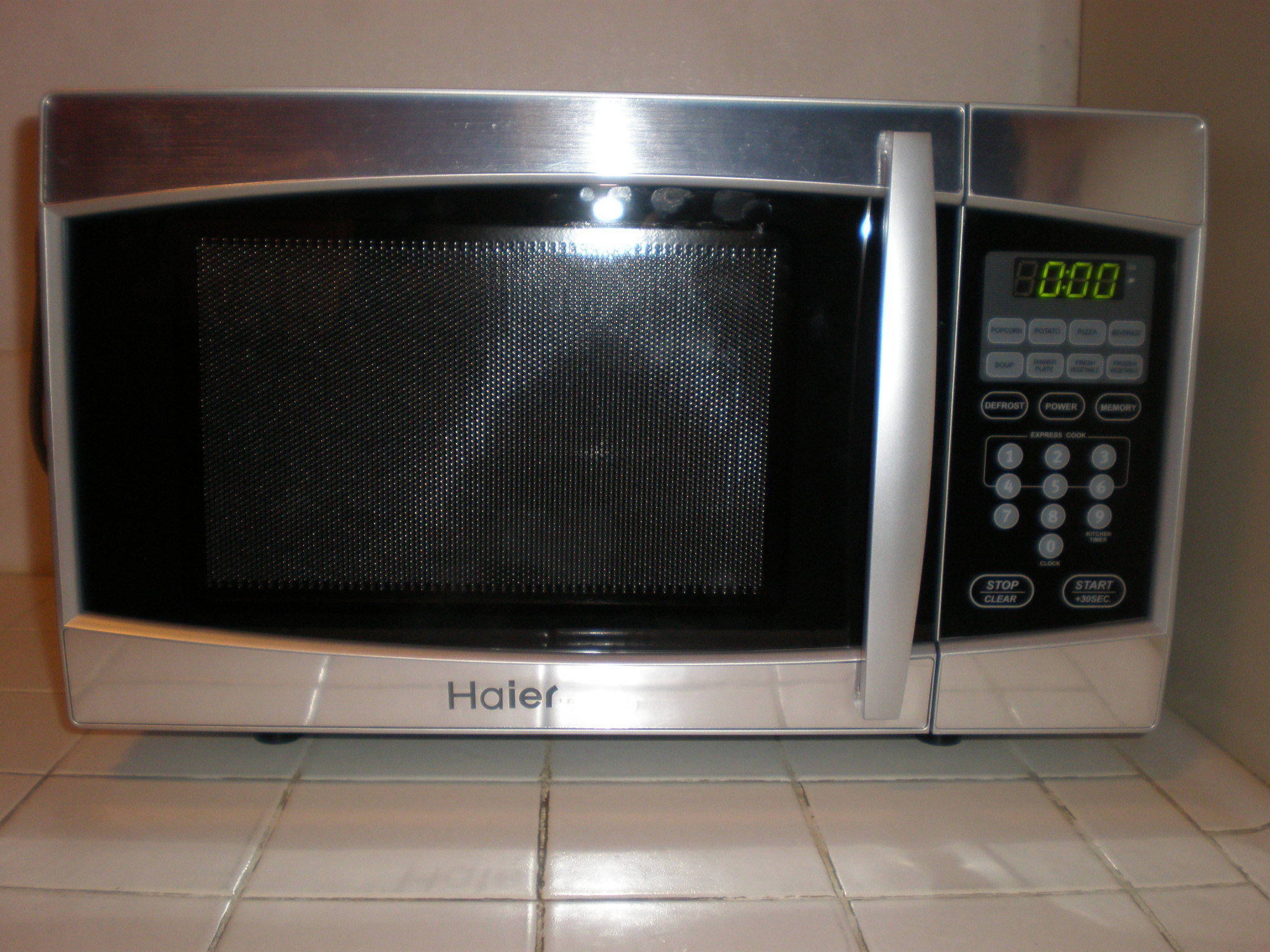
A microwave oven

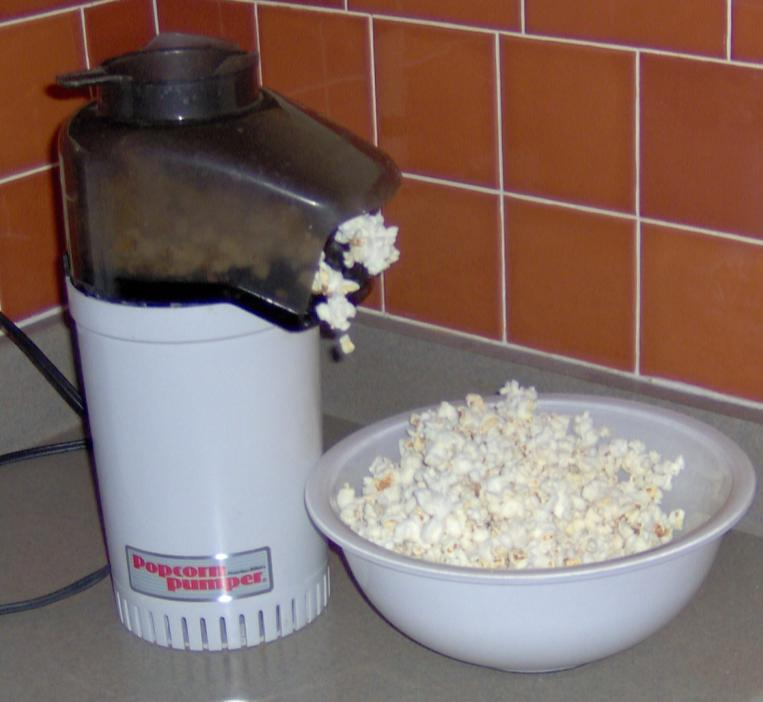
A hot-air style home popcorn maker

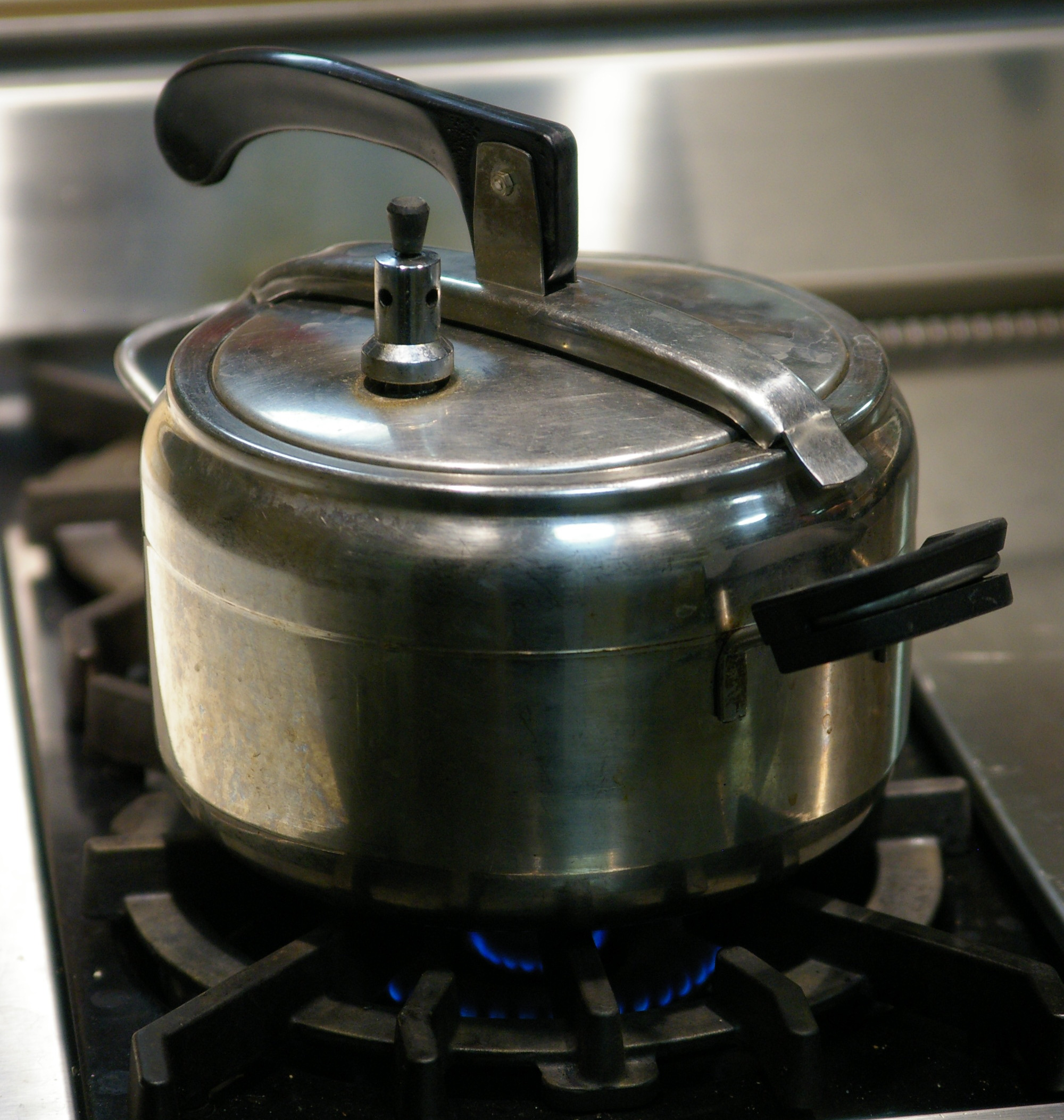
A pressure cooker

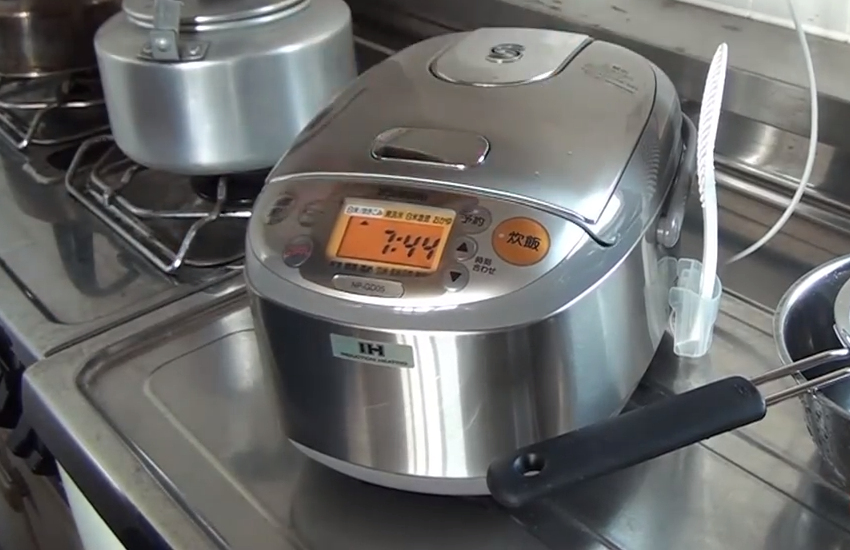
An electric rice cooker

- Air fryer
- Bachelor griller
- Bain-marie
- Barbecue grill
- Beanpot
- Beehive oven
- Brasero
- Brazier
- Bread machine
- Burjiko
- Butane torch
- Chapati maker
- Charbroiler
- Cheesemelter
- Chorkor oven
- Clome oven
- Comal (cookware)
- Combi steamer
- Communal oven
- Convection microwave
- Convection oven
- Corn roaster
- Crepe maker
- Deep fryer
- Dutch oven
- Earth oven
- Electric cooker
- Espresso machine
- Field kitchen
- Fire pot
- Flattop grill
- Food steamer
- Fufu machine
- Griddle
- Halogen oven
- Haybox
- Hibachi
- Horno
- Hot box (appliance)
- Hot plate
- Instant Pot
- Kamado
- Kitchener range
- Kujiejun
- Kyoto box
- Makiyakinabe
- Masonry oven
- Mess kit
- Microwave oven
- Multicooker
- Oven
- Pancake machine
- Panini sandwich grill
- Pie iron
- Pizza oven
- Popcorn maker
- Pressure cooker
- Pressure fryer
- Reflector oven
- Remoska
- Rice cooker
- Rice polisher
- Roasting jack
- Rocket mass heater
- Rocket stove
- Rotimatic
- Rotisserie
- Russian oven
- Sabbath mode
- Salamander broiler
- Samovar
- Sandwich toaster
- Self-cleaning oven
- Shichirin
- Slow cooker
- Solar cooker
- Sous-vide cooker
- Soy milk maker
- Stove
- Susceptor
- Tabun oven
- Tandoor
- Tangia
- Thermal cooker
- Thermal immersion circulator
- Toaster and toaster ovens
- Turkey fryer
- Vacuum fryer
- Waffle iron
- Wet grinder
- Wood-fired oven

=== Boilers ===
- Coffee percolator
- Coffeemaker
- Electric water boiler
- Instant hot water dispenser
- Kettle
- Teasmade

== See also ==
- Appliance recycling
- Beverage-can stove
- Billycan
- Cooker
- Food processing
- Induction cooking
- List of cooking techniques
- List of food preparation utensils
- List of home appliances
- List of ovens
- List of stoves
- Timeline of culinary technologies
