= Roaster =

Roaster may refer to:

- A device for coffee preparation
  - Corn roaster
  - Convection roaster
  - Pig roaster
- Hot Jupiter, a type of extrasolar planet
- One who participates in a roast
- A roaster chicken is a young meat chicken, typically 8 to 12 weeks old, weighing 5 pounds or more. They are tender-meated but have slightly more fat than smaller broilers/fryers, making them ideal for roasting whole. Roasters offer more meat per pound and develop a crispy skin when roasted.

== See also ==
- Rocester, a town
- Roadster (disambiguation)
- Rooster (disambiguation)
