= Chorkor =

- Fishing Village
- Location in Ghana
- Coordinates: 5°31′39″N 0°13′55″W
- Country: Ghana
- Region: Greater Accra Region
- District: Accra Metropolis
- Elevation: 39 ft (12 m)
- Time zone: GMT
  - Summer (DST): GMT

Chorkor is a fishing village and neighbourhood in the Accra Metropolis District, a district in the Greater Accra Region of Ghana. The Chorkor oven got its name from here. Chorkor is a densely populated community. Ga-Dangme is the largest ethnic group in Chorkor, followed by Akan. Chorkor has electricity, water pipes, schools, and clinics. Chorkor is popularly known for being the birthplace of the Azonto dance.
