= French fry vending machine =

Vending machine that dispenses hot French fries

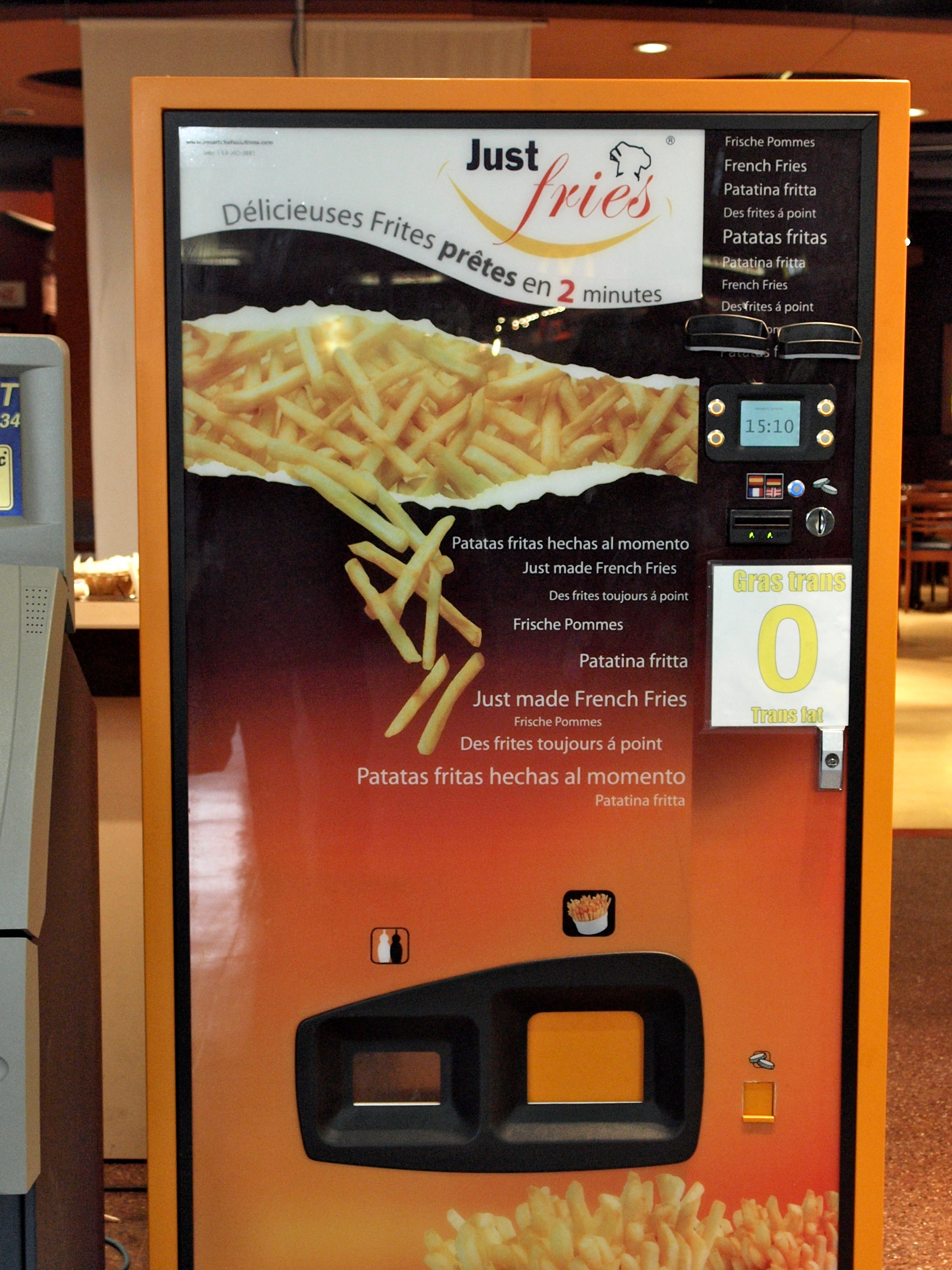
A Just Fries brand French fry vending machine at Central Station in Montreal, Canada

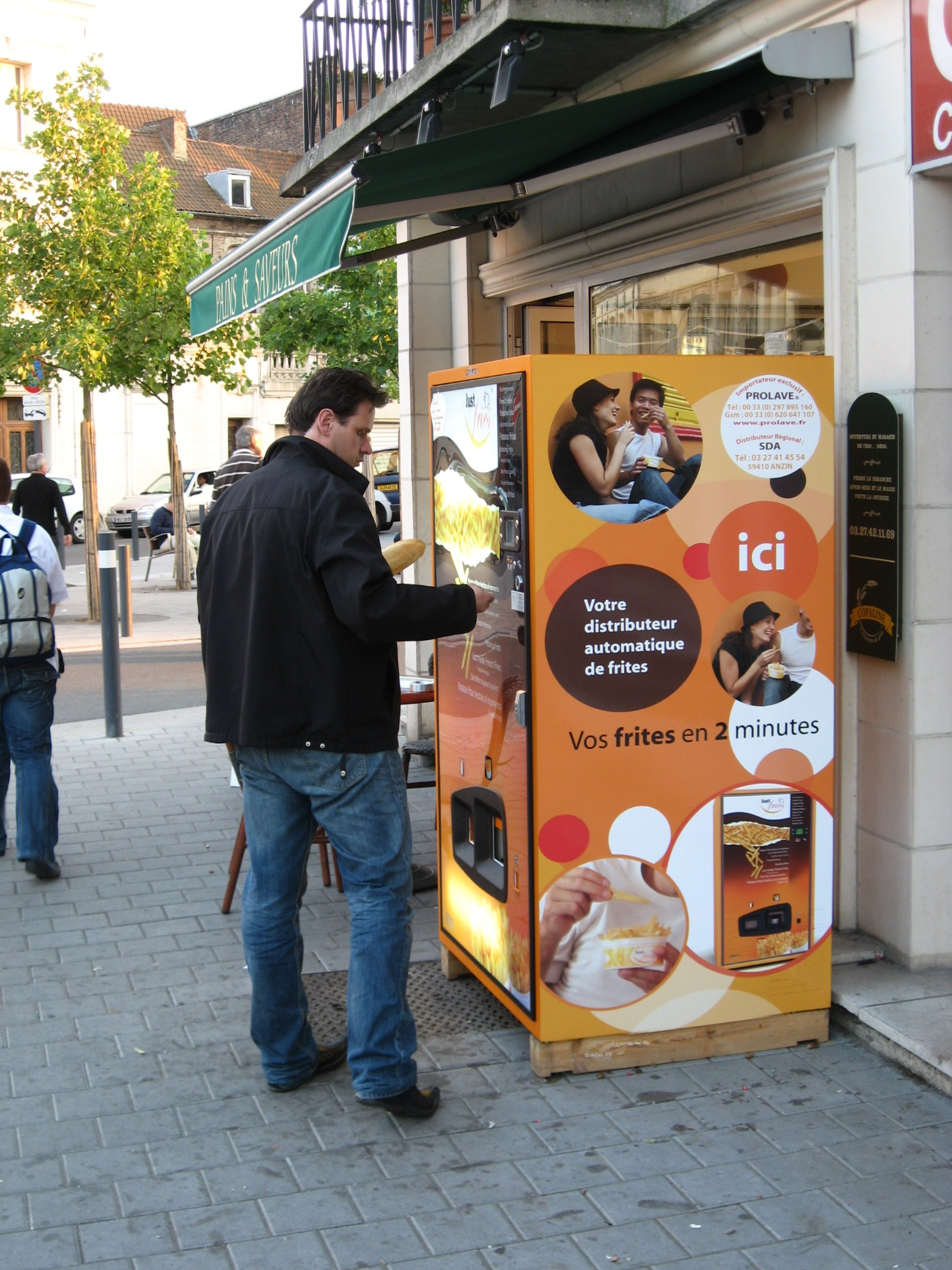
Side view of a Just Fries brand vending machine in Valenciennes, France

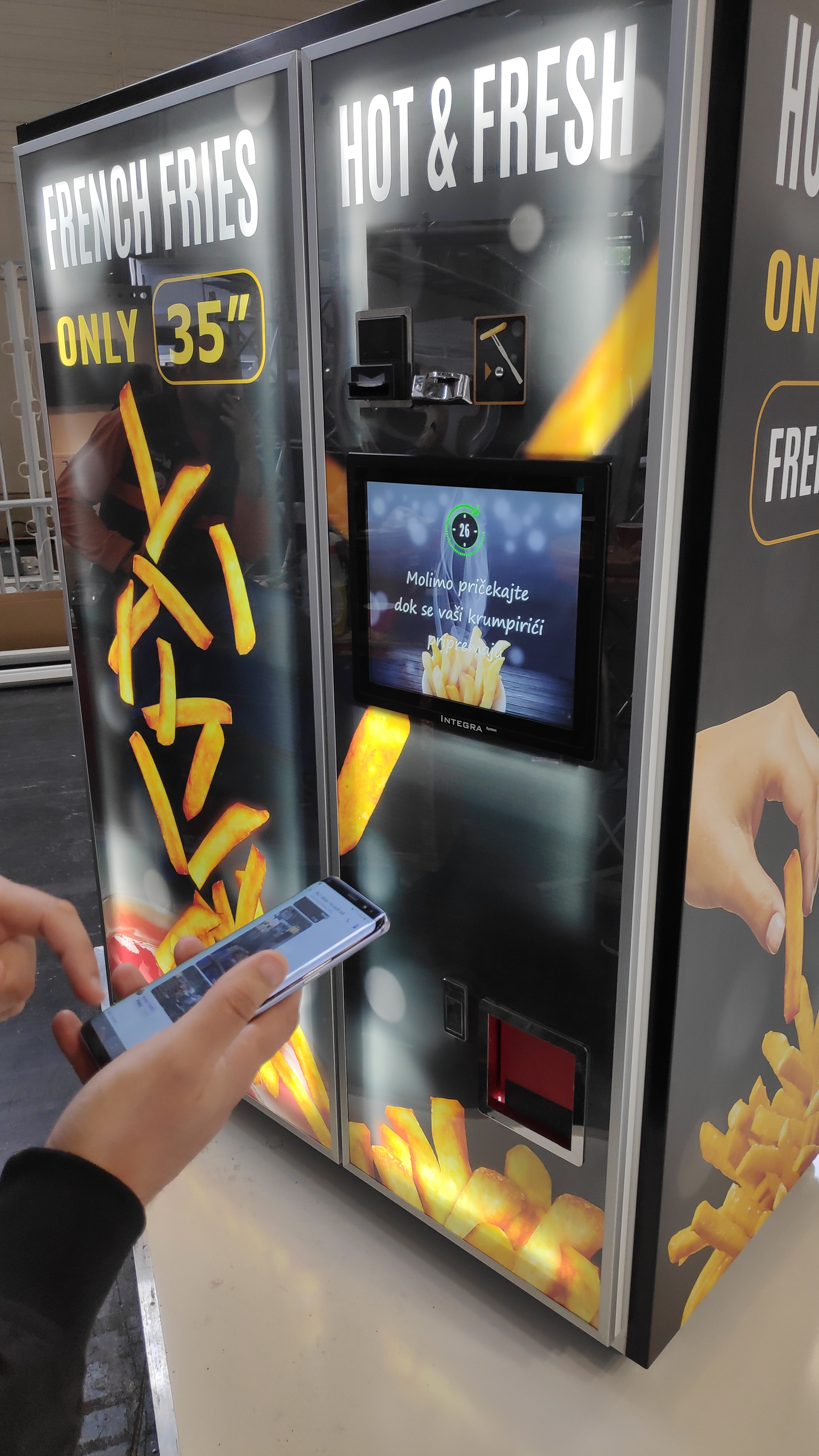
Integra Saratoga French fry machine delivers fries in 35 seconds at Köln, Germany, at exhibition Eu'Vend and coffeena 2019.

A French fry vending machine is a vending machine that dispenses hot French fries, also known as chips. The first known French fry vending machine was developed circa 1982 by the now defunct Precision Fry Foods Pty Ltd. in Australia. A few companies have developed and manufactured French fry vending machines and prototypes. Furthermore, a prototype machine was also developed at Wageningen University in the Netherlands.

== Brands, manufacturers and prototypes ==
=== Historical ===
The now defunct Australian company Precision Fry Foods Pty Ltd. designed the first known French fry vending machine, named Mr. French Fry. The company registered the design with the Australian government in January 1982. The machine cooked hot chips within 60 seconds, and operated using three AUD $0.20 coins. A salt packet was included underneath the cup that the chips were served in.

Another company, Houser Vending Co., Inc., developed a French fry vending machine named Mr. Crispy's, which was used in various locations such as college campuses and factories since at least September 1990. The fries were cooked in 365 °F (185 °C) sunflower oil for around 40 seconds, and 500 orders of fries were prepared before the oil was changed. The machine had a feature that automatically turned it off in the event of a malfunction, and it also had a fire extinguisher built into it.

=== Contemporary ===
Beyondte Technology, based in Shenzhen Province, China, began development of the Robo French fry machine in 2008, which delivers hot French fries in around 95 seconds. Beyondte Technology was acquired by Breaktime Solutions in Belgium. The machine was developed by Belgian entrepreneurs, and field tested in Brussels, Belgium during the summer of 2012. The machine weighs 750 pounds (340 kg), and can cook French fries in beef fat or cooking oil. Breaktime Solutions adapted the machine to operate using beef fat, the development of which took a year. It requires manual servicing and cleaning after around 150 orders are prepared. Later developments included installation of a ventilation system that uses three filters to reduce odors emitting from the machine. The New York Post has referred to the Robo French fry machine as the "Rolls Royce of vending machines." In August 2013, an order of French fries from the machine was priced at USD $3.50. Customers can choose an accompaniment of mayonnaise or ketchup, and can optionally add harissa, all of which are provided in single-serving packets. The machine also dispenses a small fork.

E-Vend Technology, a Russian company, manufactures a French fry vending machine in China and Israel using technology from the United States. The machine uses frozen French fries, and prepares them in around 45 seconds using hot air, rather than cooking oil.

Fotolook, s.r.o., based in Liptovský Mikuláš, Slovakia markets a French fry vending machine.

In September 2015 at Wageningen University in the Netherlands, students and entrepreneurs presented a fully automatic, prototype vending machine that cooks frozen potato strips by deep frying them. The final product is served with mayonnaise, ketchup or curry. The process takes around two minutes from start to finish, in which the product is served in a paper cup. The potato strips are stored in a frozen state inside the machine at −18 °C (0 °F), and it cooks them in oil at 180 °C (356 °F). The unit uses a specially designed dispenser to prevent the potatoes from being crushed or broken. As of September 2015, only the single prototype is available, which is housed at Wageningen University. Orders are placed using a touchscreen, and a fork and salt are provided separately in a box.

== Gallery ==
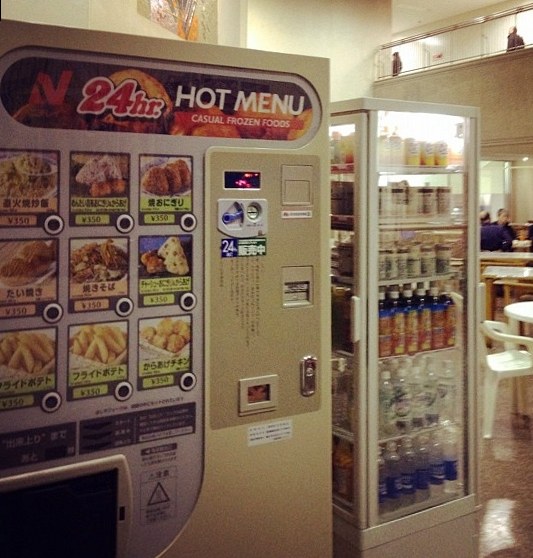
A Nichirei vending machine that offers prepared French fries (Tokyo, 2012)

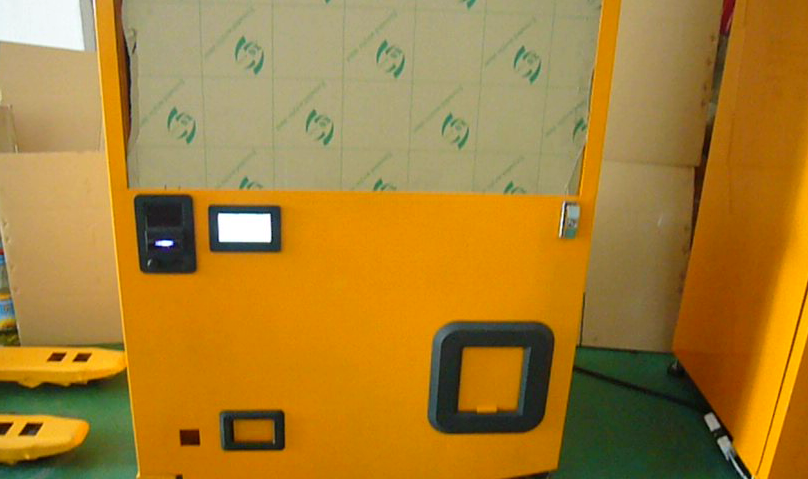
Partial view of the front of an unused Beyondte French fry vending machine (2012)

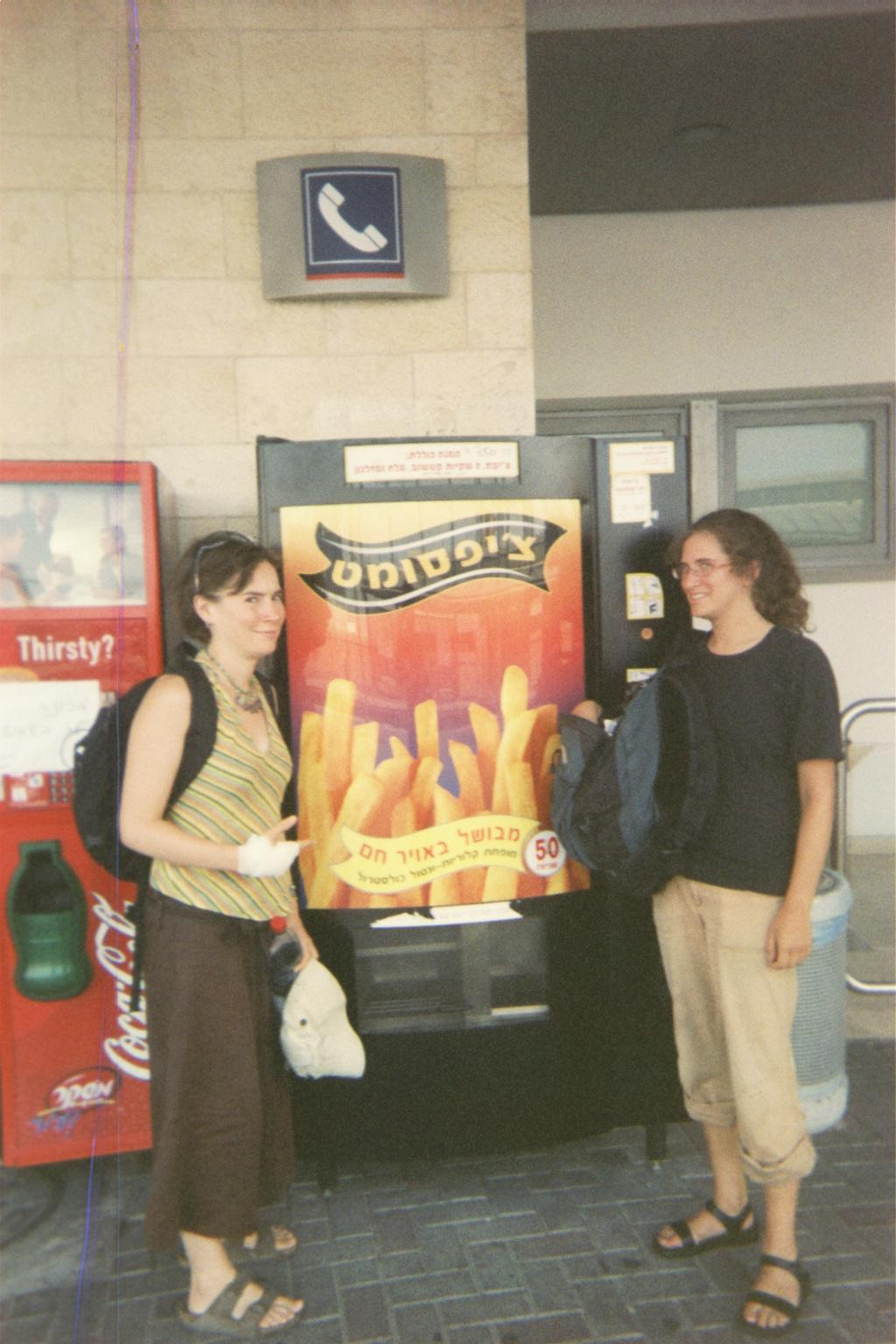
A French fry vending machine in Safed, Israel (2005)

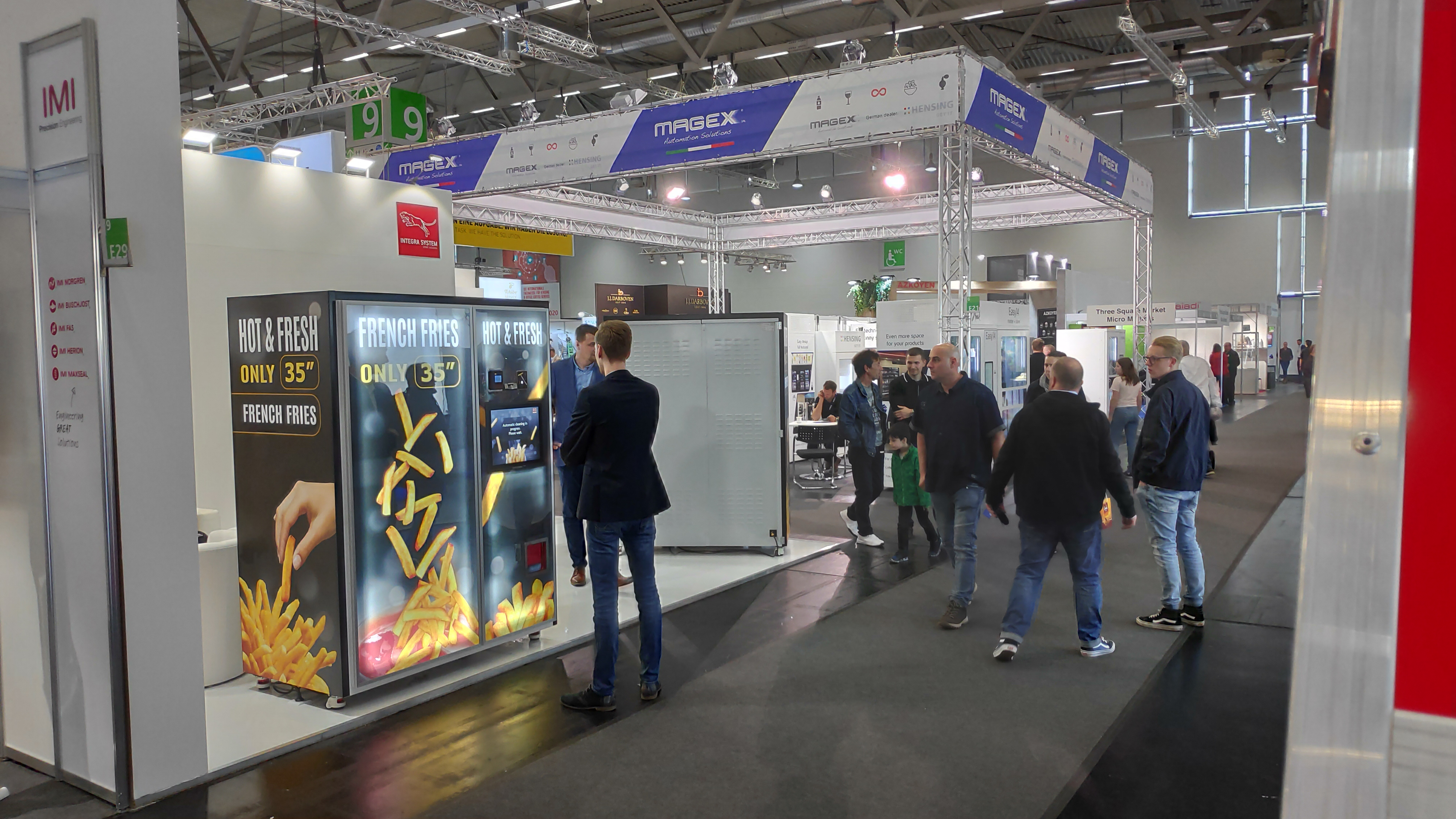
Integra French fry machines at Integra d.o.o. booth at Köln Germany, Eu'Vend and coffeena (2019)

== See also ==
- Beverly Hills Caviar Automated Boutique – purveys caviar, escargot and truffles dispensed from vending machines
- Pancake machine – a machine that automatically produces cooked pancakes
- Let's Pizza
