= Let's Pizza =

Pizza vending machine company

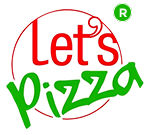
- Industry: Food vending machine
- Headquarters: Zagreb, Croatia
- Products: Vending machines
- Owner: Svesa food-beverages
- Website: letspizzaeu.com

Let's Pizza is a company, which manufactures pizza making vending machines. The pizzas are prepared from scratch and it is the first vending machine to produce freshly made ready-to-eat pizza. Let's Pizza machines combine technology with traditional pizza making. Customers can choose their preferred toppings, and the machine will prepare the dough, add sauce and toppings, and bake the pizza in a matter of minutes.

== Information ==
The machine combines water, flour, tomato sauce, and fresh ingredients to make a pizza in approximately three minutes. It includes windows so customers can watch the pizza as it is made. The pizza is cooked in an infrared oven. The machine is made to create 100 pizzas before it needs to be refilled with its ingredients.

== History ==
The development of the pizza vending machine began in the mid-1990s. Let's Pizza's machine cooks pizzas from scratch and a working prototype was made in 2003. The machines were made in Northern Italy. Later that year, test marketing began in Germany. The rollout started in 2009, when the machines spread over Europe, especially through Italy. Let's Pizza entered the South Korean market in 2015.

== See also ==
- French fry vending machine
- Pancake machine
- Automat
