= Beverly Hills Caviar Automated Boutique =

Vending machines in Los Angeles County, California, United States

- Industry: Vending machine retail Gourmet food retail
- Founded: 2012
- Headquarters: Los Angeles County, California, United States
- Number of locations: 3 (2013)
- Products: Caviar; Escargot; Truffles; Blinis; Flavored salts

The Beverly Hills Caviar Automated Boutique sells caviar, escargot and truffles from vending machines.

In 2013, the machines began operating in three locations: Westfield Century City, Westfield Topanga and Hollywood and Highland Center. The owners credit their daughter for coming up with the idea when they were purchasing a cupcake from a vending machine. The coverage of the placement of the machines included the comments "I feel sure that, very soon, you will be able to buy engagement rings, tiaras, mink coats and leather bodices amid all the excitement of the mall -- but without the interruption of some obsequious store assistant," from CNet, and a marketing analyst stating that the idea was merely to generate buzz.

The machines offer a selection of caviar in different sizes, ranging from 40 grams (1.5 ounces) to 400 grams (a little less than a pound). The caviar ranges in price from $30 an ounce for American Black caviar to $500 an ounce for Imperial River Beluga caviar, as well as vegan caviar and dried mullet caviar (popular in Algerian, French, Jordanian, Spanish, and Tunisian cuisine). In addition to caviar, the machines offer blinis, escargot, flavored salts, and Italian truffles. The machine was built in Spain. The machine holds about $50,000 worth of temperature-controlled merchandise. After being dispensed, the product takes about 30 minutes to thaw but can stay cool up to 3 hours in an insulated box.

== See also ==
- French fries vending machine
