= Pancake machine =

Machine that automatically produces pancakes

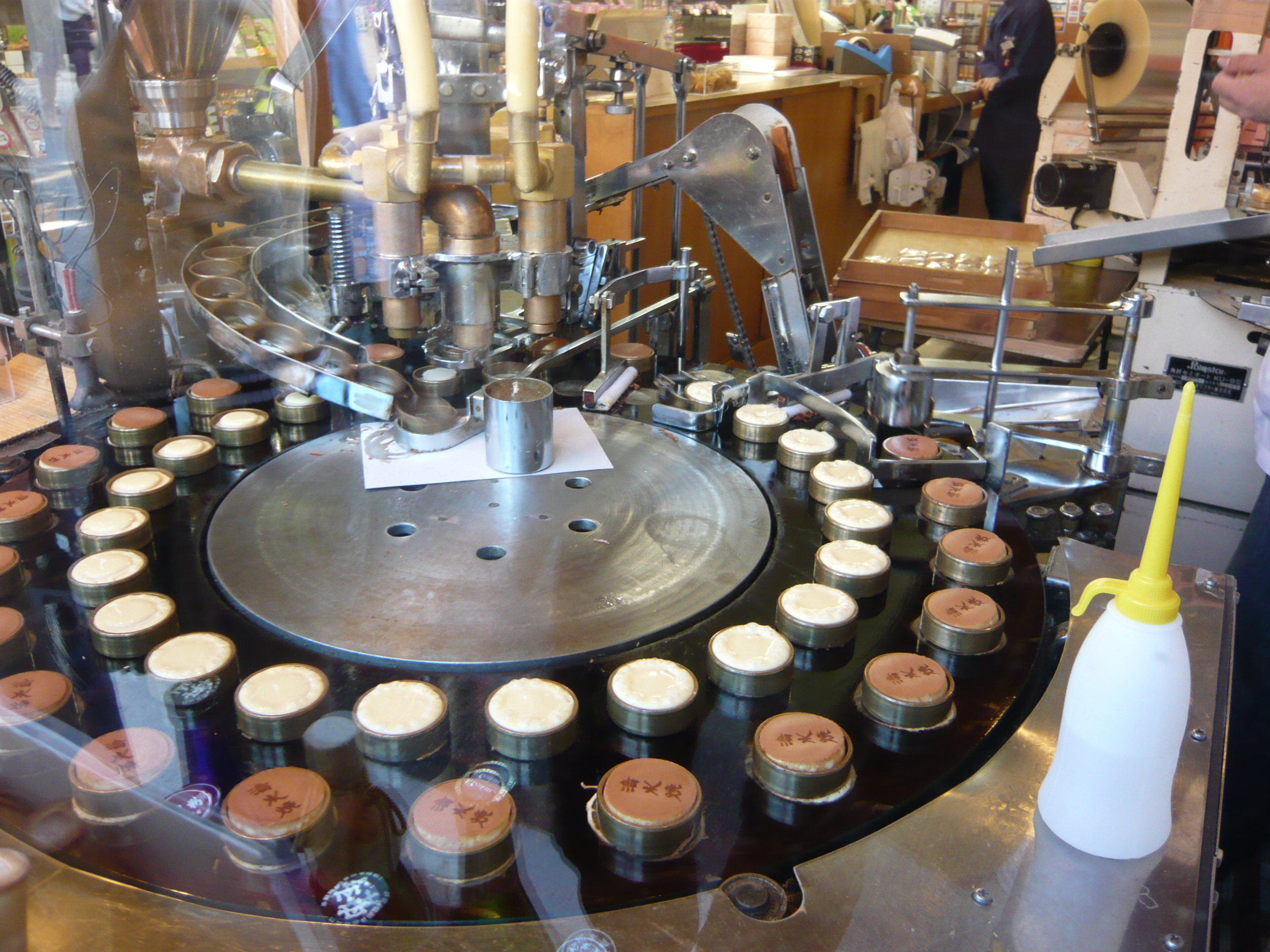
A revolving automatic pancake machine

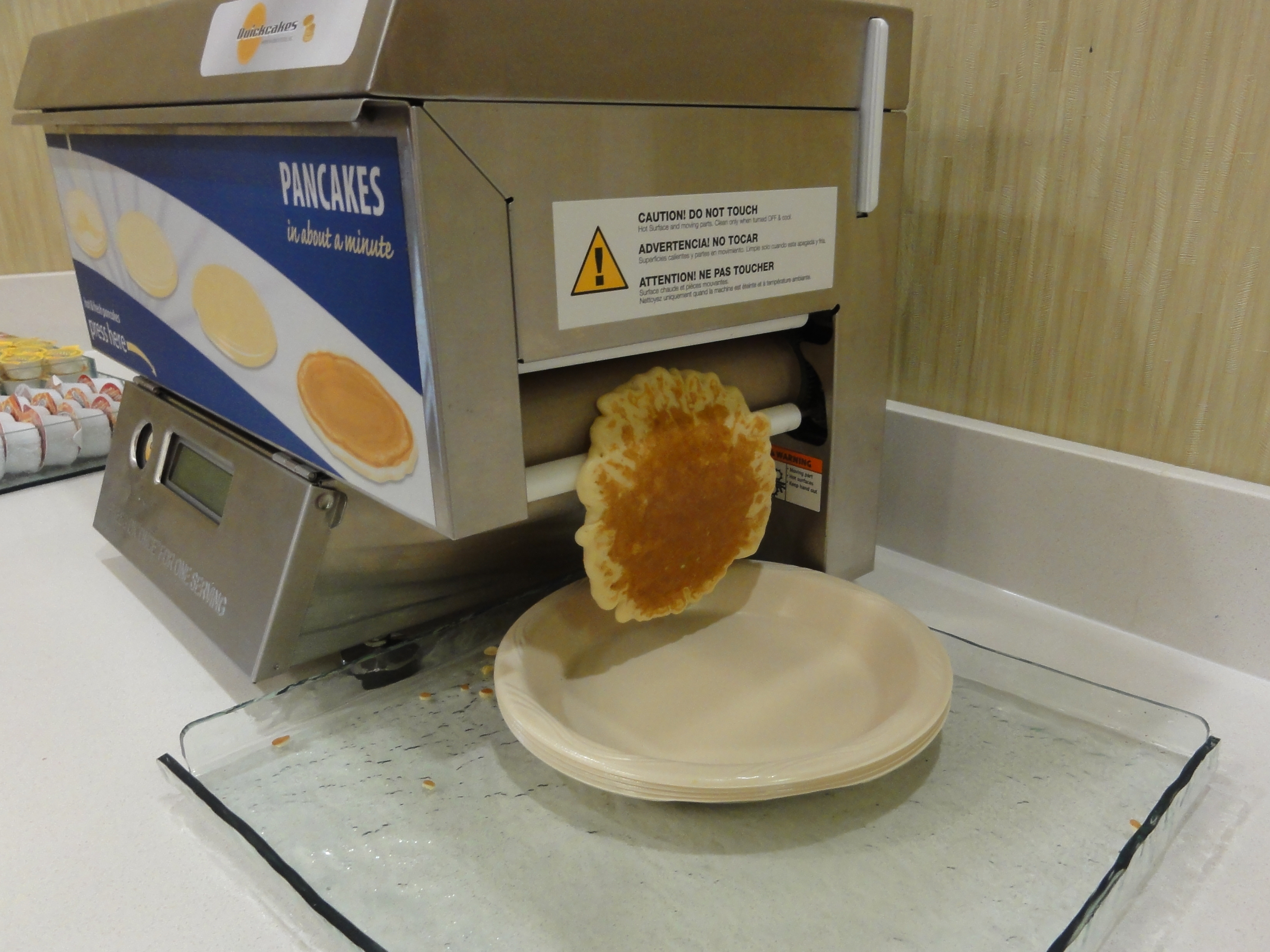
A Quickcakes pancake machine ejecting a finished pancake onto a plate

A pancake machine is an electrically powered machine that automatically produces cooked pancakes. It is believed that the earliest known pancake machine was invented in the United States in 1928. Several types of pancake machines exist that perform in various manners, for both commercial and home use. Some are fully automatic in operation, while others are semi-automatic. Some companies mass-produce pancake machines, and some have been homemade.

== History ==
In 1928, a man in Portland, Oregon, invented an electric pancake machine that operated by the process of batter being dropped onto a revolving heated flattop grill from a storage cylinder atop the grill. The grill was heated using electricity. The amount of batter dropped was controlled by using controlled amounts of compressed air, which pushed batter out of the storage cylinder. As the batter revolved on the hot grill, the pancake was flipped halfway through the cooking process by a shelf atop the grill. After being flipped, the completed pancake was ejected from the machine upon contact with a gate.

In 1955 in the United States, an automatic pancake machine was developed by Vendo, which used a specially formulated pancake batter mix that was manufactured by the Quaker Oats Company's Aunt Jemima branch. The Vendo machine could produce pancakes "in less than three minutes". It was a semi-automatic machine that performed all of the cooking functions except for the pouring of the pancake batter.

== Types and uses ==
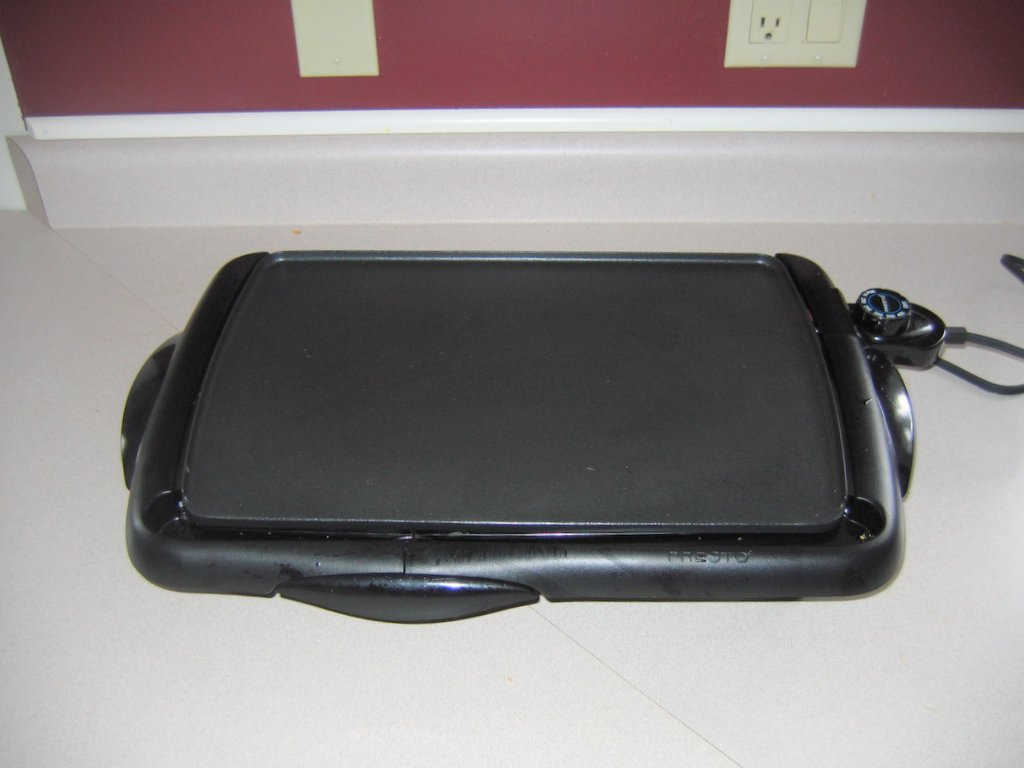
A basic electric griddle with temperature control

Various types of pancake machines exist, such as those that run pancake batter through a heated conveyor inside of a box unit, and those that automatically drop pancake batter onto a flattop grill. Some pancake machines, such as one developed by Crepe-Coer, cook both sides of a pancake simultaneously. Semi-automatic pancake machines also exist, which require some human interaction to function, such as the pouring of batter. Commercial pancake machines may be used in the foodservice industry, in cafeterias and by restaurants, and can serve to reduce the waste of stale pancake batter. Some hotels have pancake machines that guests are allowed to operate. They are also used in other environments in a self-service manner, such as in upscale airport lounges and hotels.

Homemade versions of pancake machines have been constructed. An example of a homemade pancake machine is one constructed in 1977 by Ken Whitsett of the Ocala Kiwanis Club in Ocala, Florida, which was used for the organization's annual pancake day. The Kiwanis machine utilized a hopper filled with pancake batter that was manually dropped onto a revolving griddle. The pancakes were manually flipped and plated when cooking was completed. It required four people for its operation, and could produce between 750 and 1000 pancakes per hour.

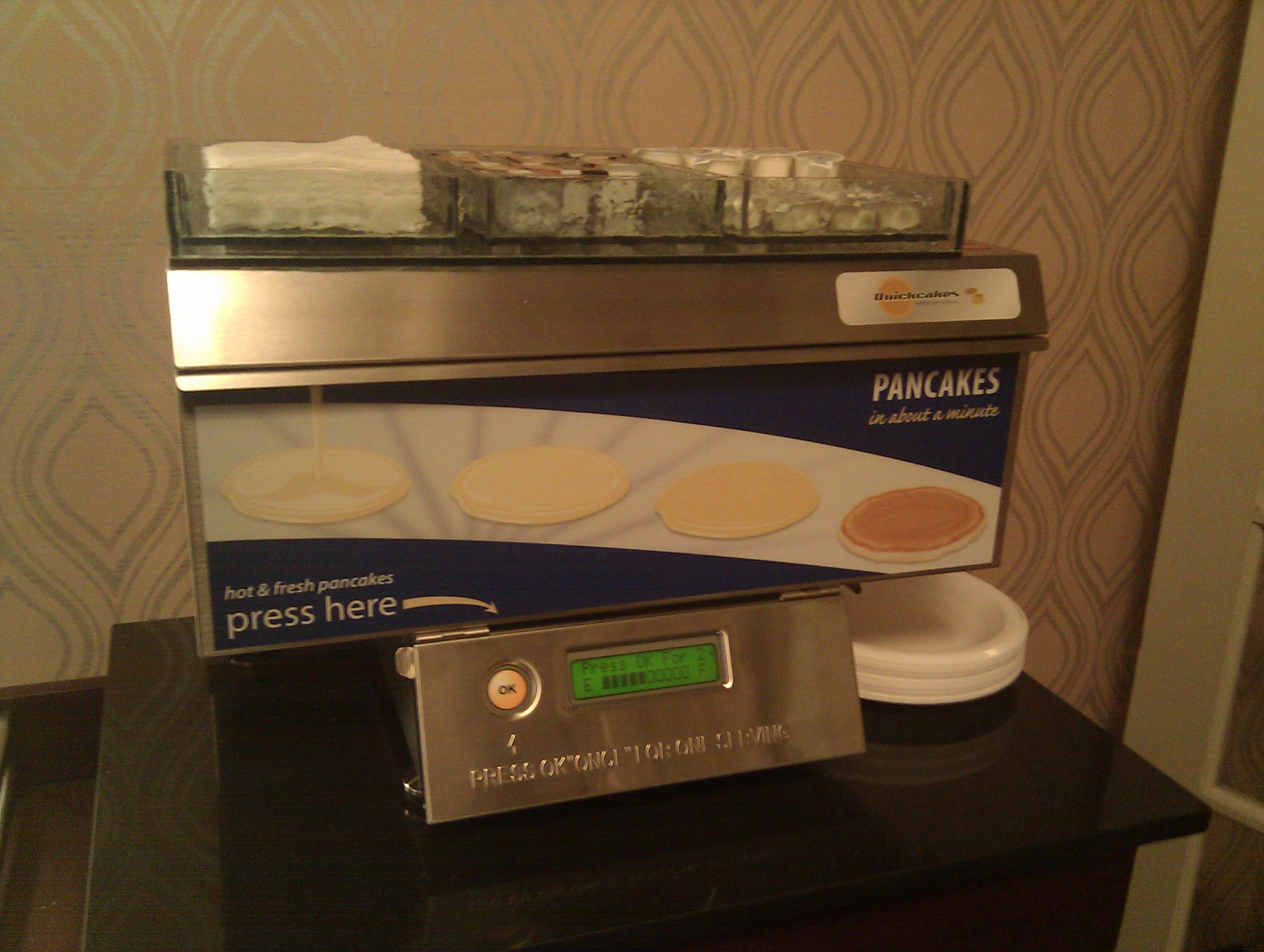
Front view of a Quickcakes-brand pancake machine, with various condiments atop the machine

Commercial pancake machines are typically used in the commercial foodservice and hospitality industries. Popcake is an international company that produces Popcake-brand pancake machines, which can produce 200 pancakes per hour. Individual pancakes are produced in seconds by this machine. The machine was designed for use in commercial establishments such as cafeterias and convenience stores. The Popcake machine was invented by Marek Szymanski in Australia, and as of July 2014 approximately 7,000 of them are used worldwide. This brand has features that allow users to adjust the size, quantity and doneness level of the pancakes produced.

In March 2015 in the U.S., the PancakeBot pancake machine received over $141,000 on Kickstarter. Its target donation request on the website was $50,000. PancakeBot can produce custom pancakes in various designs, which is performed by the use of pancake batter in a bottle that is moved by a programmable machine arm atop the griddle. The machine utilizes custom software to accomplish this.

== See also ==
- Food processing
- French fries vending machine
- Let's Pizza
- List of cooking appliances
- Waffle iron
