= Corn on the cob =

Whole sweet corn, consumed as food

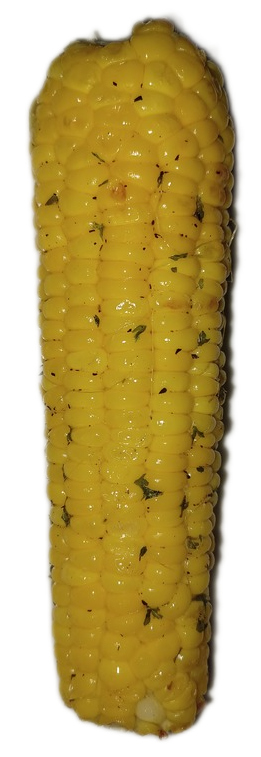
- Course: Side dish or main
- Main ingredients: Maize (corn)
- Ingredients generally used: Butter, salt, parsley, pepper

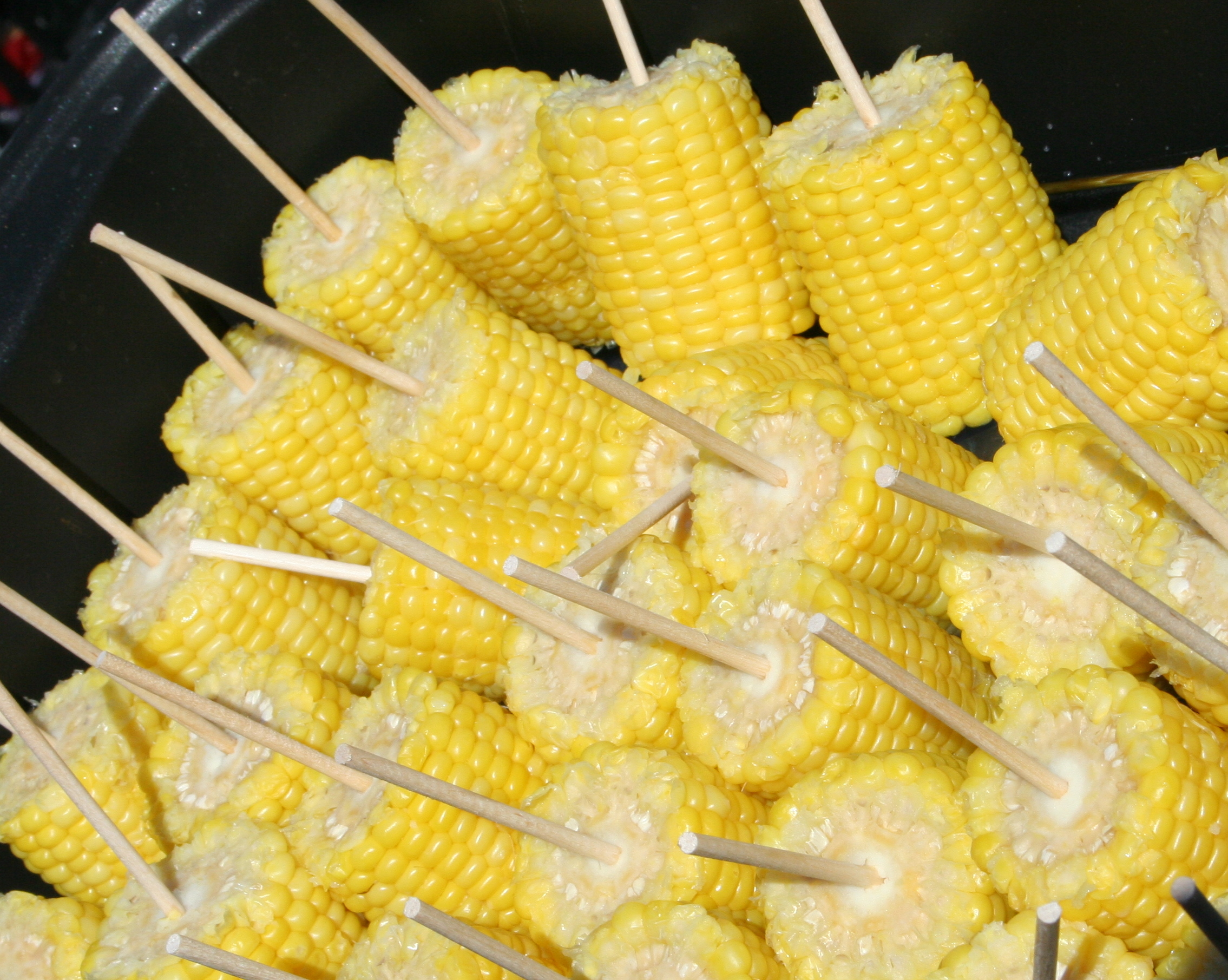
Cooked corn on the cob with serving sticks

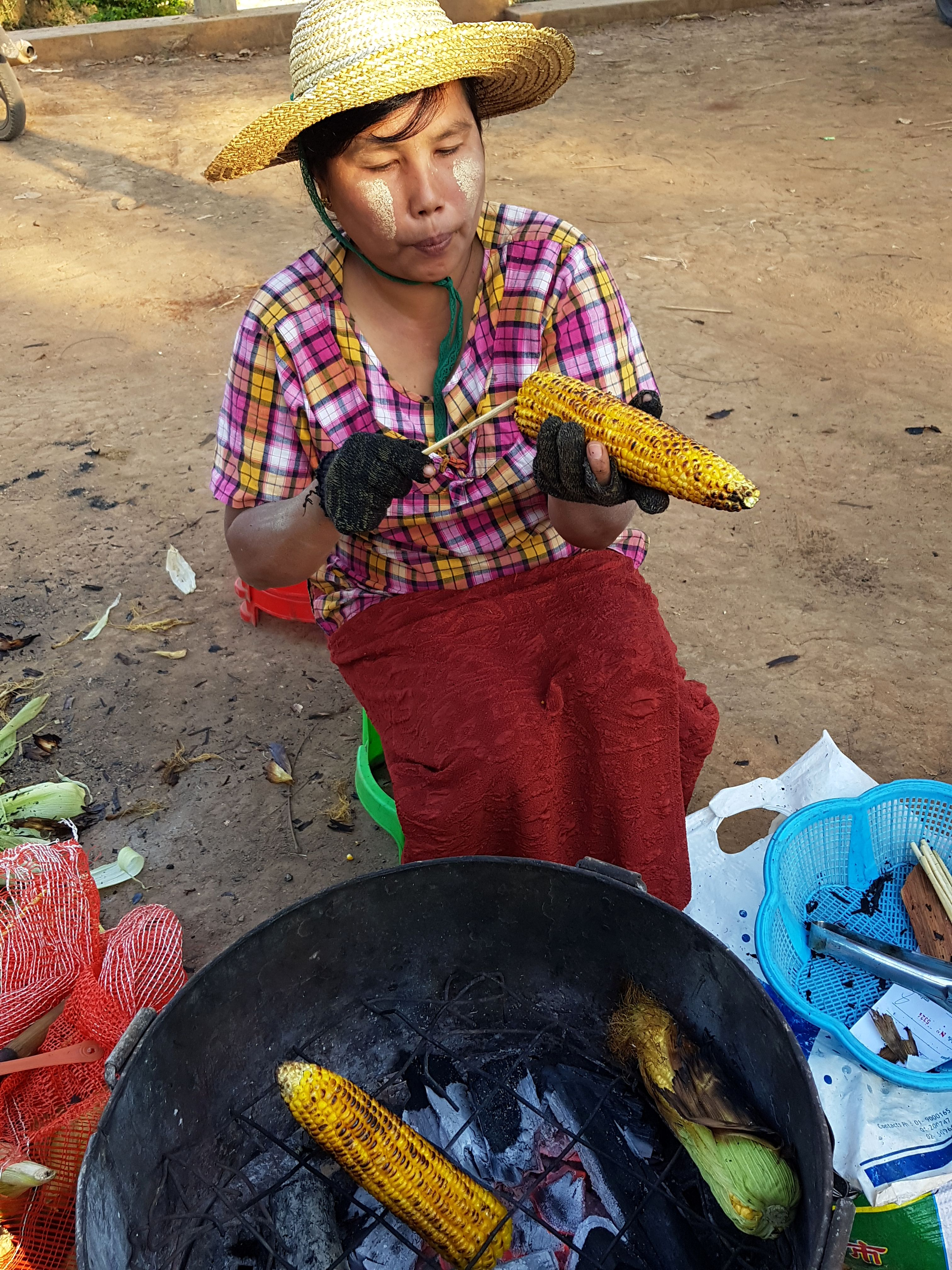
Preparing roasted corn on the cob in Loikaw (Myanmar).

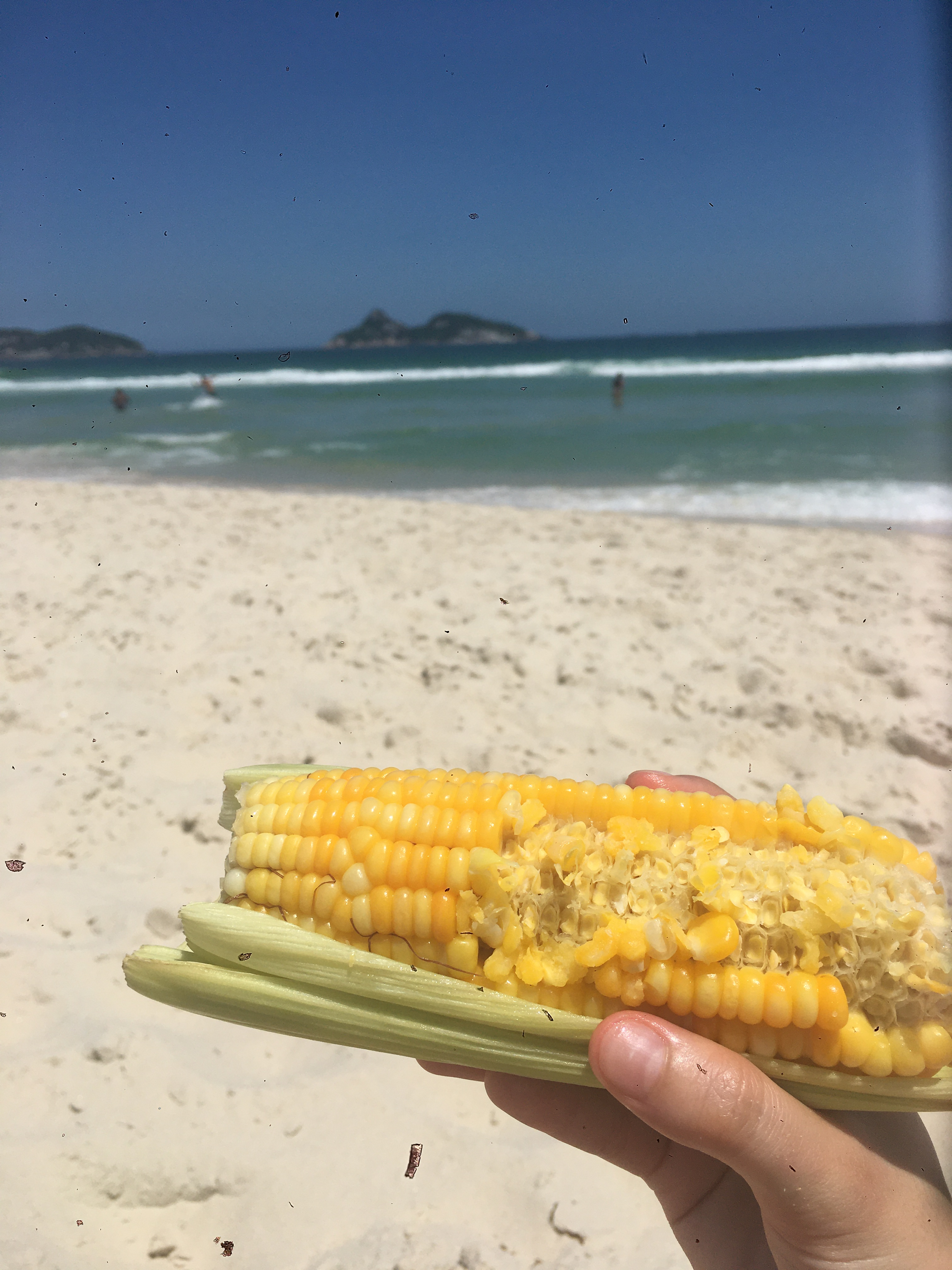
Brazilian corn on the cob at Barra da Tijuca, Rio de Janeiro

Corn on the cob is a culinary term for a cooked ear of sweet corn (maize) eaten directly off the cob. Variations of the corn on the cob include the Masala Bhutta in India, Yaki-tōmorokoshi in Japan and Elote in Latin American countries.

Corn intended to be eaten on the cob is picked while the endosperm is in the "milk stage", when the kernels are still tender. Ears of corn are steamed, boiled, or grilled usually without their green husks, or roasted with them. The husk leaves are removed before serving.

Corn on the cob is normally eaten while still warm, and is often seasoned with salt and butter. Some diners use specialized skewers, thrust into the ends of the cob, to hold the ear while eating without touching the hot and sticky kernels.

After corn is picked, the sugar in its kernels converts to starch: it takes only one day for it to lose up to 25% of its sweetness, so it is ideally cooked on the same day as it is harvested.

== Preparation ==
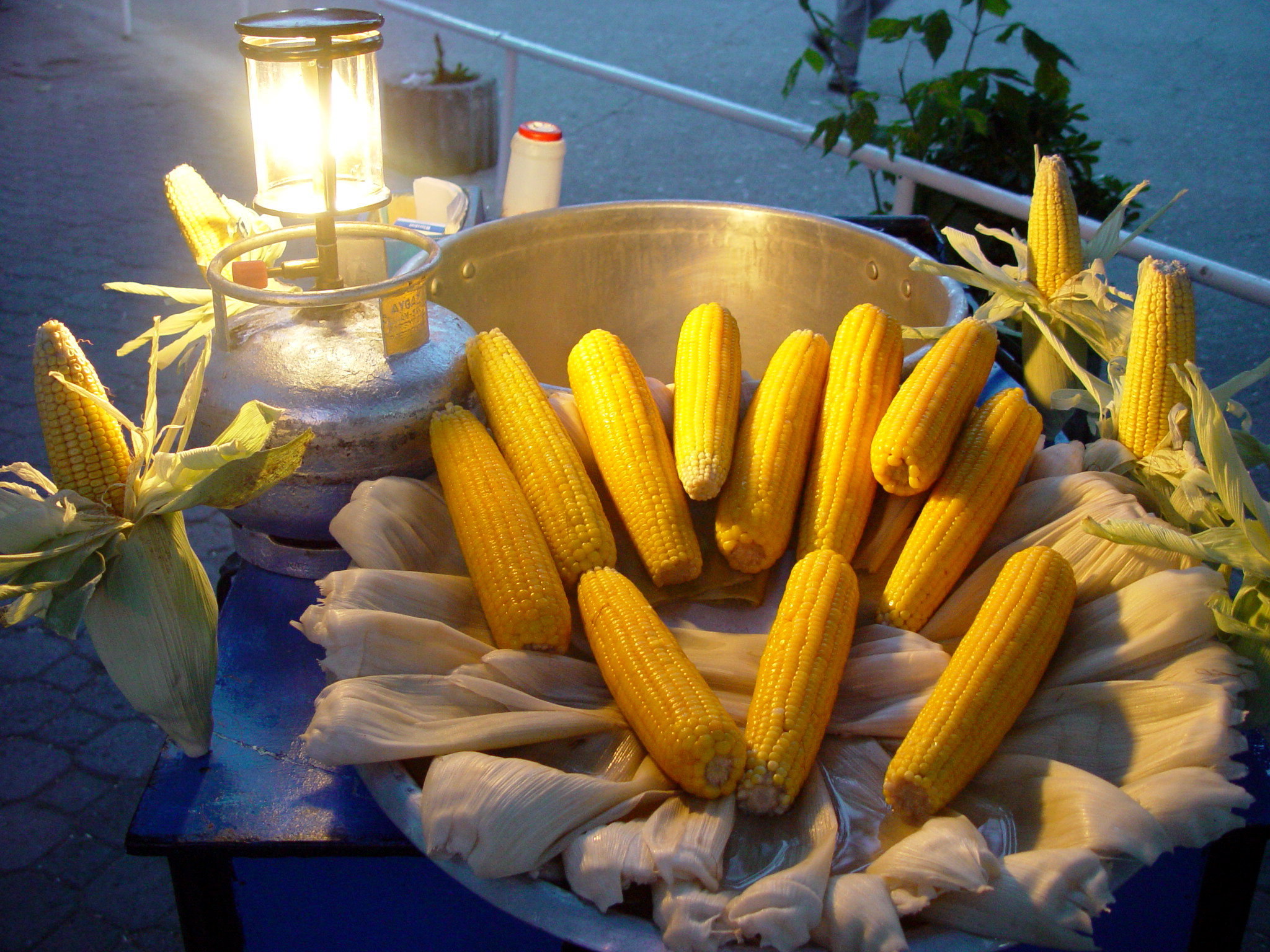
Cooking corn on the cob by boiling

The most common methods for cooking corn on the cob are frying, boiling, roasting, grilling, and baking. Corn on the cob can be grilled directly in its husk, or it can be shucked first and then wrapped in aluminum foil. When oven roasting, cooking the corn in the husk directly on the rack is recommended. When roasting or grilling corn on the cob, the cook can first peel the husk back to rub the corn with oil or melted butter, then re-secure the husk around the corn with a string. Corn on the cob can also be microwaved for 3 to 4 minutes still in its husk.

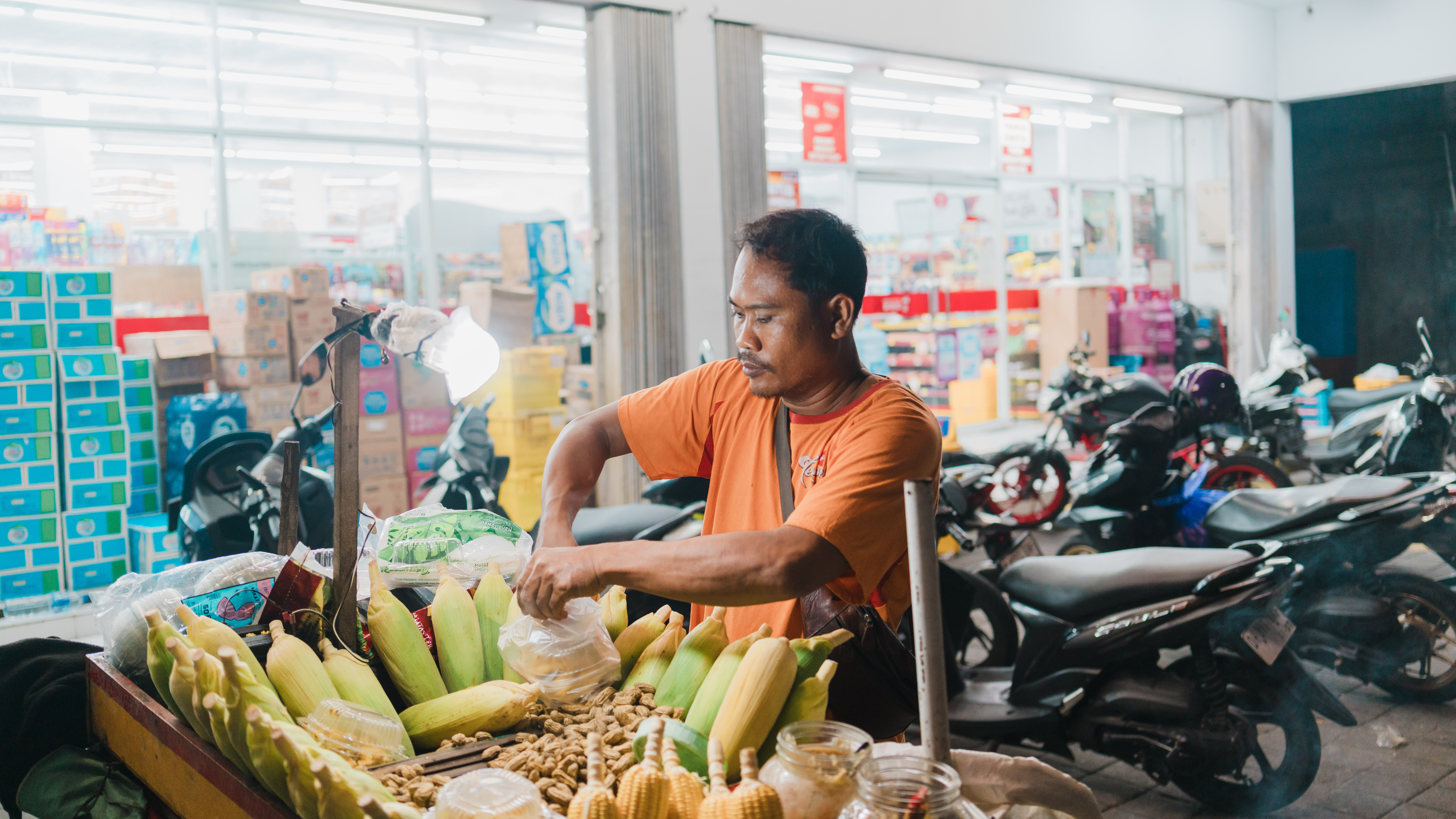
Corn on the cob being roasted in Bali

Common condiments and seasonings for corn on the cob include butter, salt, Old Bay, and black pepper.

== Etiquette ==
In traditional etiquette, corn on the cob, like other finger foods, is problematic.

Lillian Eichler Watson, in a 1921 etiquette book, described corn on the cob as "without a doubt one of the most difficult foods to eat gracefully." She added that "it is entirely permissible to use the fingers in eating corn, holding it lightly at each end; sometimes a napkin is used in holding it." Sometimes, however, a short sharp knife would be provided that each diner could use to cut or scrape the kernels from the cob for later eating. She described this as "by far the most satisfactory method" of eating corn on the cob.

Some etiquette books recommend salting and buttering the corn a section at a time just before eating that section, which helps to minimize the mess on the diner's face and hands. Butter dripping down the diner's chin and kernels getting stuck in between teeth may be a source of embarrassment for the diner.

== Holders ==
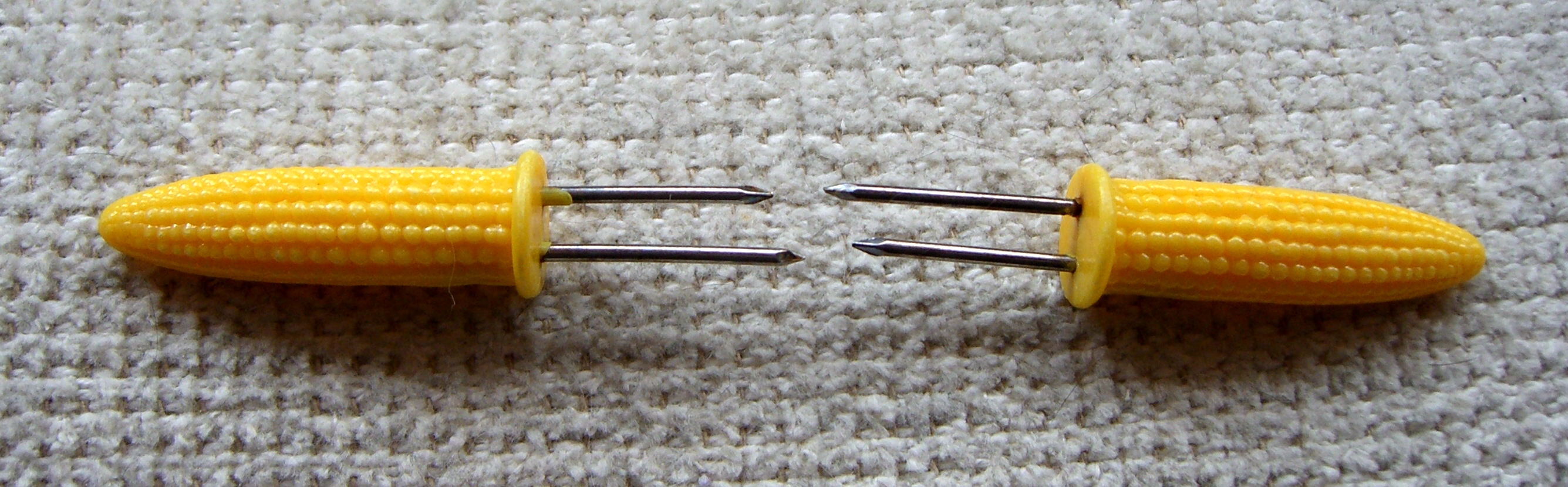
Holders for eating corn on the cob

Corn cob holders are eating utensils used to hold the corn on the cob. They may have tines or a single spike, and have been used since ancient times, ranging from articles made of wood now conserved in ethnographic museums to precious tableware made of silver.

Other utensils for eating corn on the cob include specialty knives for removing the kernels, brushes for removing the silk and knives for buttering.

== History ==
Sweet corn was eaten by Native American tribes before European settlers arrived in the Americas. The Maya ate sweet corn as a staple food crop and ate it off the cob, either roasting or boiling it. Aboriginal Canadians in southern parts of Canada also eat it.

Corn on the cob is one of the most consumed foods on the Fourth of July in the United States.

== Variations ==
=== Elote ===
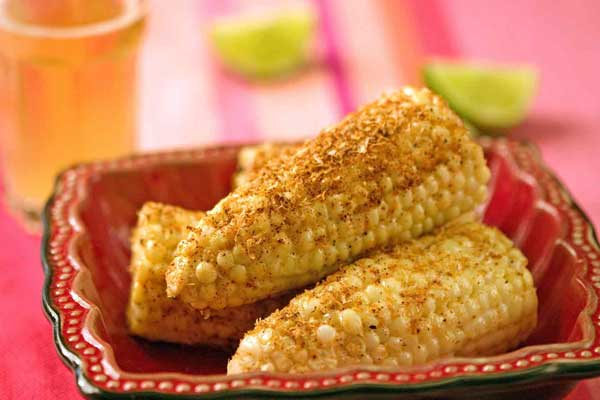
Elote

In Mexico and most of Central America, an ear of corn, on or off the plant, is called elote (from the Nahuatl elotitutl for "tender cob"). This term is also used in Mexican and Central American communities in the United States.

In the Andean countries (except for Venezuela and Colombia) as well as Uruguay and Paraguay, an ear of corn is choclo (from Quechua chuqllu). In Venezuela, it is jojoto. In Colombia, Panama, Puerto Rico, Cuba, the Dominican Republic and Spain, it is known as mazorca.

In El Salvador, Mexico and the border states of the United States, elote is eaten both as a sweet and as a salty dish. It is most commonly boiled in water with seasonings such as tequesquite, epazote or the Santa Maria herb, pericón. The boiled ear is served with condiments such as butter, mayonnaise, and grated Cotija cheese, and in the case of Mexico, chili powder, lemon juice, and salt. Elote or elotes locos ("crazy corn"), is also served at town fairs in Mesoamerica, served on a stick for holding it and seasoned with mayonnaise, sweet and sour sauce, ketchup and mustard.

In some regions of Mexico, elotes are sold in the street from food carts by stationary or mobile eloteros. Vendors offer corn with hard or soft kernels of varying sizes, along with toppings such as sour cream, mayonnaise, liquid cheese, chile powder, grated cheese, or butter. The elotes are kept hot by putting them in the brazier where they were cooked and are generally served soon after they are cooked. The elotes are usually boiled and transported wrapped in the husks, because cooking them in the husks gives them more flavor.

The eloteros also sell coal-grilled elotes (elotes asados). These elotes are splashed with salt water and grilled in the coals until the husks start to burn and the kernels reach a crunchy texture. In Central America, it is customary to grill elote during the first harvest of the year – the end of June until the beginning of September. During this time, women can be seen on the sides of highways next to the cornfields selling grilled elote seasoned with lime juice and salt.

In Peru, choclo con queso is a popular street food in which the corn on the cob is grilled on hot coal and served with Peruvian salted cheese. It is also a common dish sold on inter-regional buses.

=== Quebec ===
A popular use for corn on the cob in Quebec is for serving at an épluchette de blé d'Inde, or corn-shucking party. At this informal type of celebration, the guests help to shuck the corncobs, which are then boiled and served with butter and salt, often along with other foods.

=== Yaki-tōmorokoshi ===
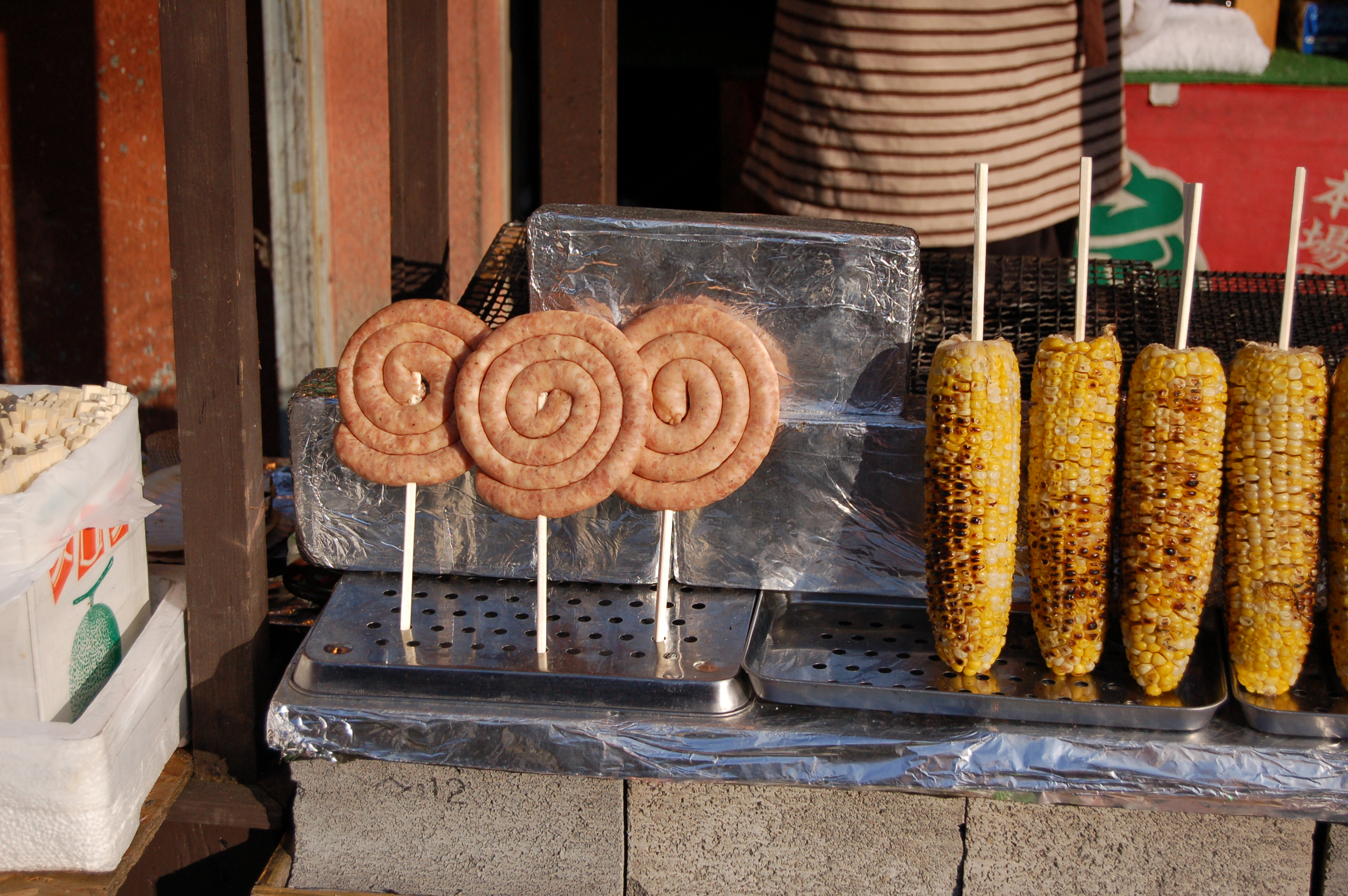
Yaki-tōmorokoshi, on the right

Yaki-tōmorokoshi (焼きとうもろこし, "roasted sweet corn") or yaki-tōkibi is a Japanese snack. Generally, corn is coated with soy sauce and grilled. In the middle of the Meiji Era (around 1890), the popularity of yaki-tōmorokoshi stalls spread in Sapporo, Hokkaido. Yaki-tōmorokoshi stalls remain a common sight at Japanese festivals.

=== Masala bhutta ===
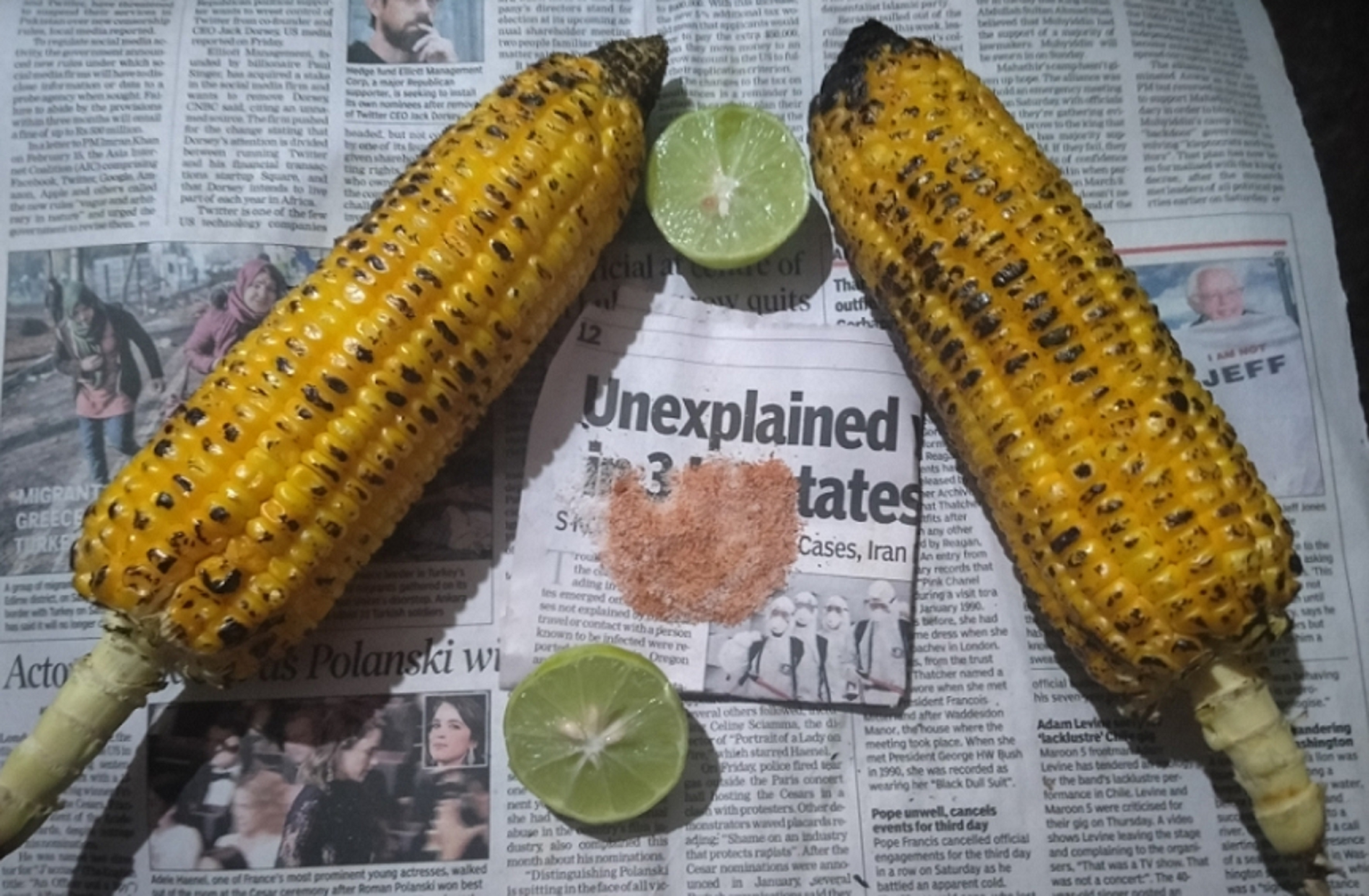
Indian style roasted corn, with lime and masala

Masala bhutta (Hindi: मसाला भुट्टा, lit. '"spice corn"') is a popular Indian street food. It is prepared with grilled corn seasoned by lime juice and masala (spice mix).

== See also ==
- Corn dog
- Corn roaster
- List of maize dishes
- Maize
- Sweet corn
