= Chorkor oven =

Oven used for fish smoking in Ghana

A Chorkor oven is an oven used for fish smoking. It gets its name from Chorkor, a fishing village and suburb of the capital of Ghana, Accra. In Chorkor, this oven is widely used for smoke-drying sardinella (in Ghana also known as 'herring', not to be confused with the real herring Clupea harengus) and other fish. The Chorkor oven was an improvement of the traditional rectangular oven with a fixed surface. It was developed in the early 1970s by the Ghana Food Research Institute in collaboration with the women of Chorkor village and assisted by an FAO project.

On a Chorkor oven, the fish is spread on removable trays, several of which are stacked on top of the oven. The advantages are larger capacity, reduced fuelwood consumption, and better product quality. A disadvantage is its higher initial cost because of the need for sawn planks, wire mesh and skilled carpenters. Also, it is less suitable for smoking fish of different size.

Traditional fish smoking in Africa is essentially a drying process to preserve the fish in the absence of refrigeration. Contrary to fish smoking in temperate climates the fish is not salted and small fish is not gutted. The fish is first cooked over a high fire and then smoke-dried in one to five days (and nights) over a low fire. The smoking time depends on fish size and market demand, sometimes the market wants "fresh-dried" fish, while "hard-dried" fish with a longer storage life is produced for the off season and for distant markets. Fresh-dried fish keeps for up to a week, while hard-dried fish keeps for several months.
