= Corn roaster =

Large grill for cooking corn

External videos
- "A Day In The Life Of A Fair Corn Roaster". CBS Minnesota

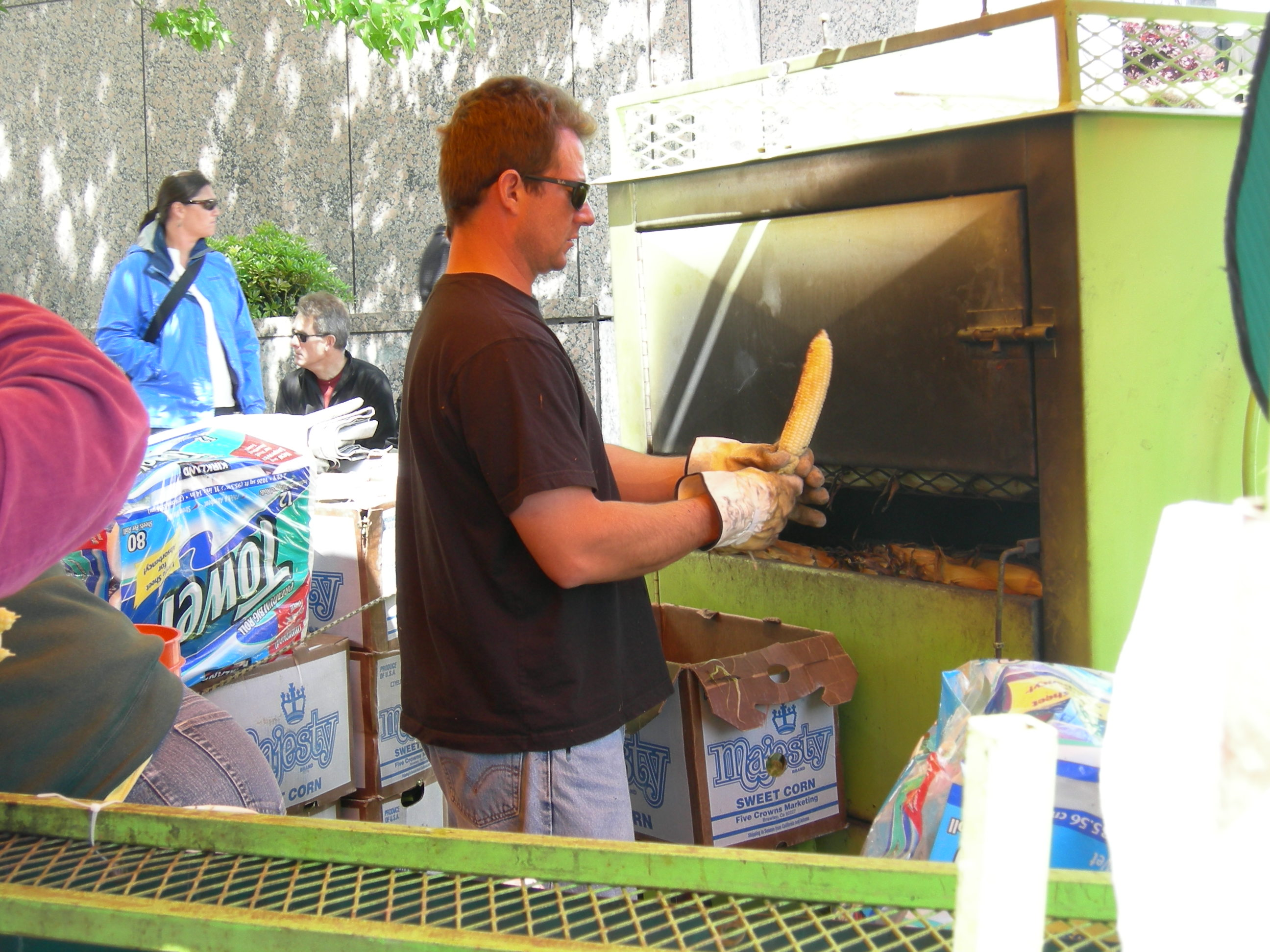
A corn roaster being used at a street fair in Seattle, Washington

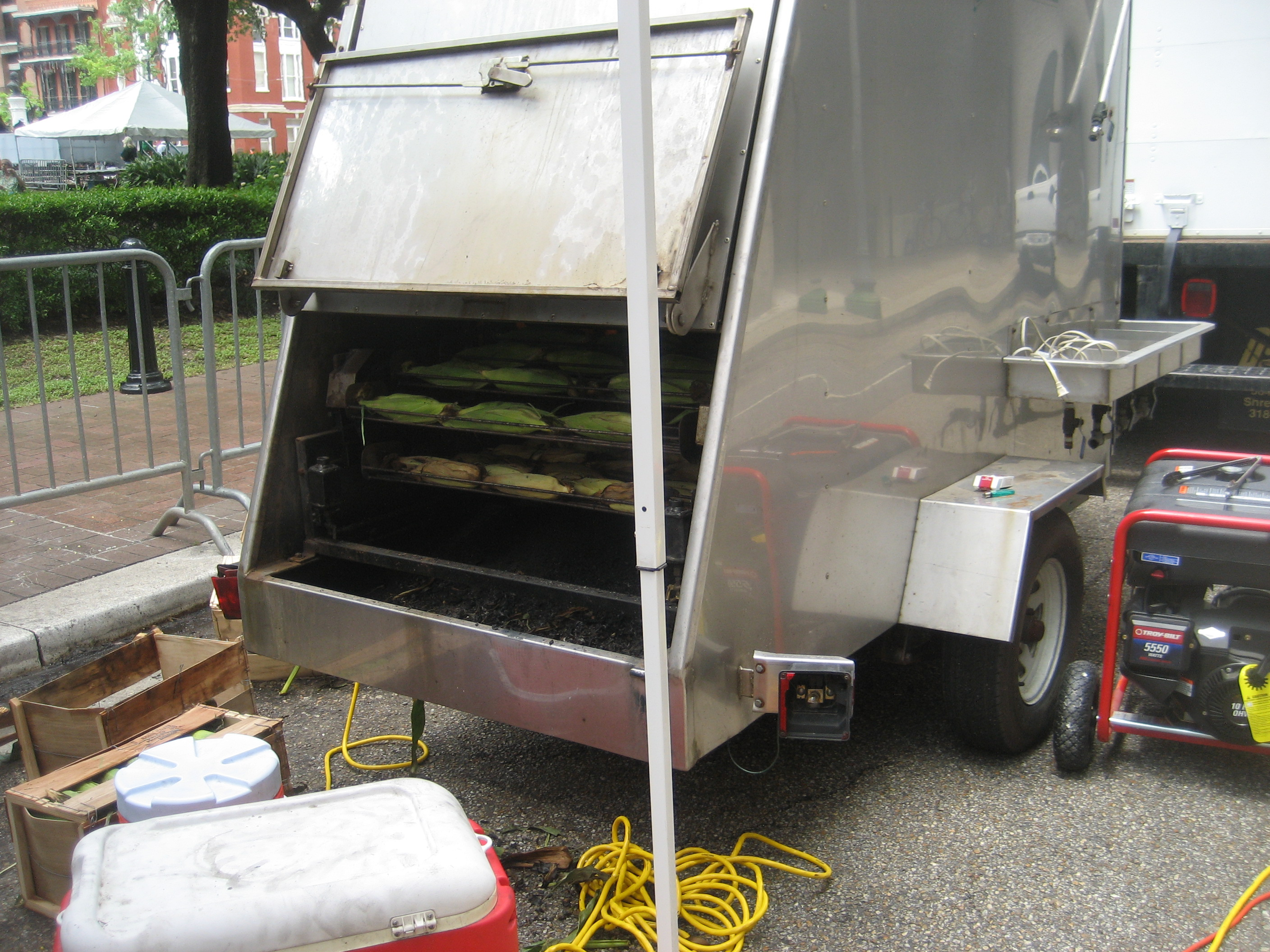
A commercial corn roaster

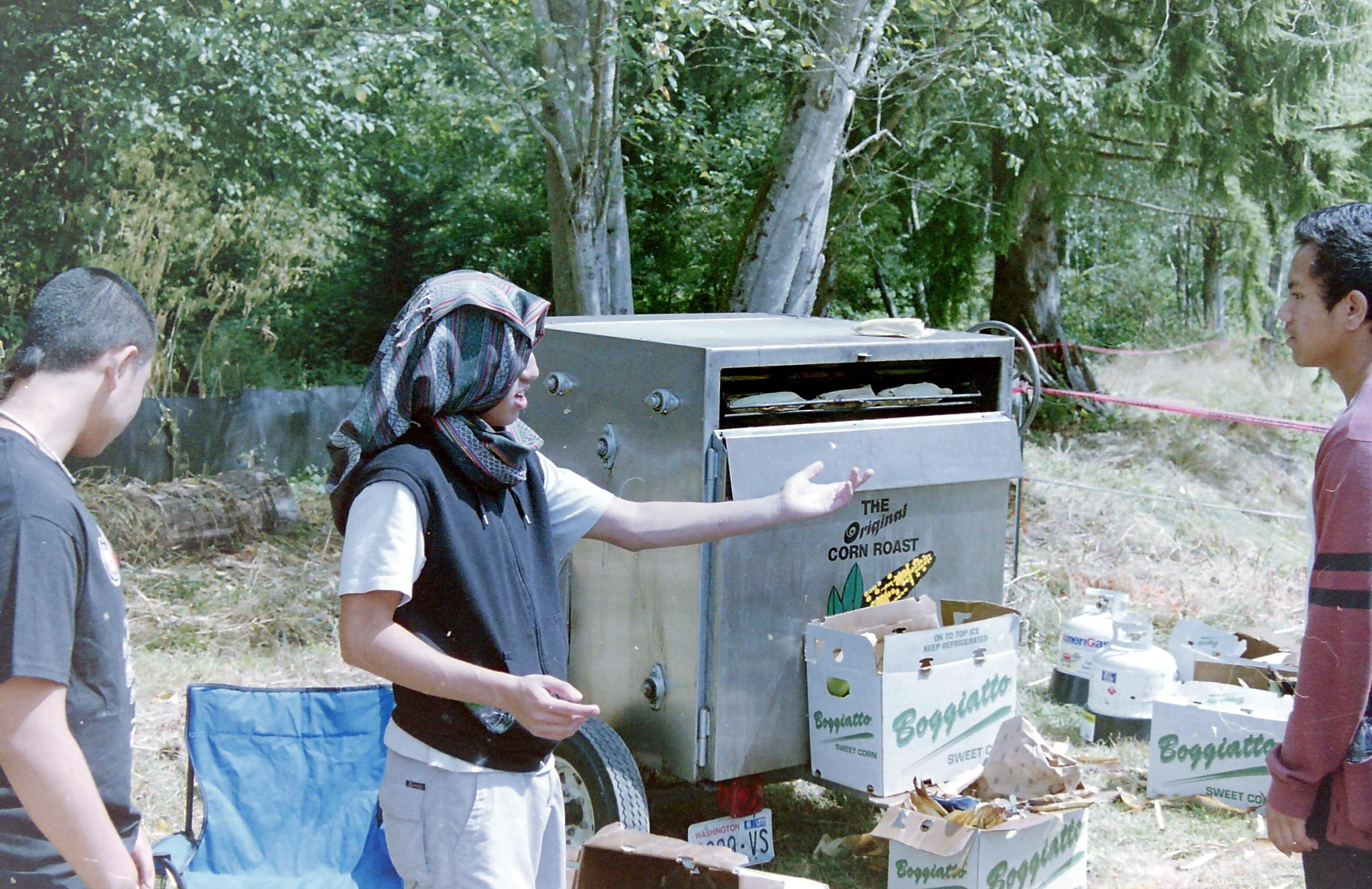
A smaller commercial corn roaster

A corn roaster is a large grill for cooking large batches of ears of corn at the same time. The term "corn roaster" can also refer to a person who roasts corn. Corn roaster machines have existed in the United States since at least 1900. Corn roasters are used by concession vendors at festivals, fairs, events, parties, and holidays, such as the Fourth of July in the United States. Roasted corn is a very popular festival food in the American South, Southwest, and Northwest. Corn roasters can also cook foods such as turkey legs, potatoes, and sweet potatoes. They may also be used by street food vendors. Street vendors may operate seasonally, per the seasonality of corn crops. Some organizations that operate corn roasters at events, such as fairs, donate their proceeds to charities.

Many commercial corn roasters come mounted on a trailer. The corn roasters use LPG for fuel. Smaller versions exist, such as rotary corn roasters that can be placed on a table, and some corn roasters are homemade.

== Manufacturers ==
There are several different manufactures who make corn roasters in the United States. A company that produces corn roasters is Holstein Manufacturing. A brand of corn roaster is named "Roast-O-Matic". Some corn roasters can roast up to 1,200 ears of corn per hour.

== Use at events ==
At the annual Minnesota State Fair in Falcon Heights, Minnesota, a group of up to 50 to 55 personnel produces significant quantities of roasted corn, which can vary daily. This variance can range between 10,000 and 18,000 ears of roasted corn a day. Approximately 180,000 ears of roasted corn are produced for the duration of the fair. Roasted corn at the Minnesota State Fair has been described as "one of the fair’s most popular foods for more than 28 years". At the Yakima Valley Fair in Yakima, Washington, the Grandview Rotary Club has been operating a corn roaster for 40 years, and donates the proceeds to various local needs.

== See also ==
- Corn on the cob
- List of cooking appliances
