= Kitchener range =

The Kitchener Range (c. 1802) is a closed-top range patented by George Bodley, a Devon iron-founder. It had a cast-iron hotplate over the fire with removable boiling rings. The second image is more common than the final one, having an oven only to one side. The term Kitchener appears to be applicable to either the single or double oven design.

A further claim, is that the Kitchener range was designed by William Flavel in 1829 and lives on in the modern interpretation by Rangemaster, who is still based at Flavel's original foundry in Royal Leamington Spa, England.
