= Kamado =

Traditional Japanese cook stove

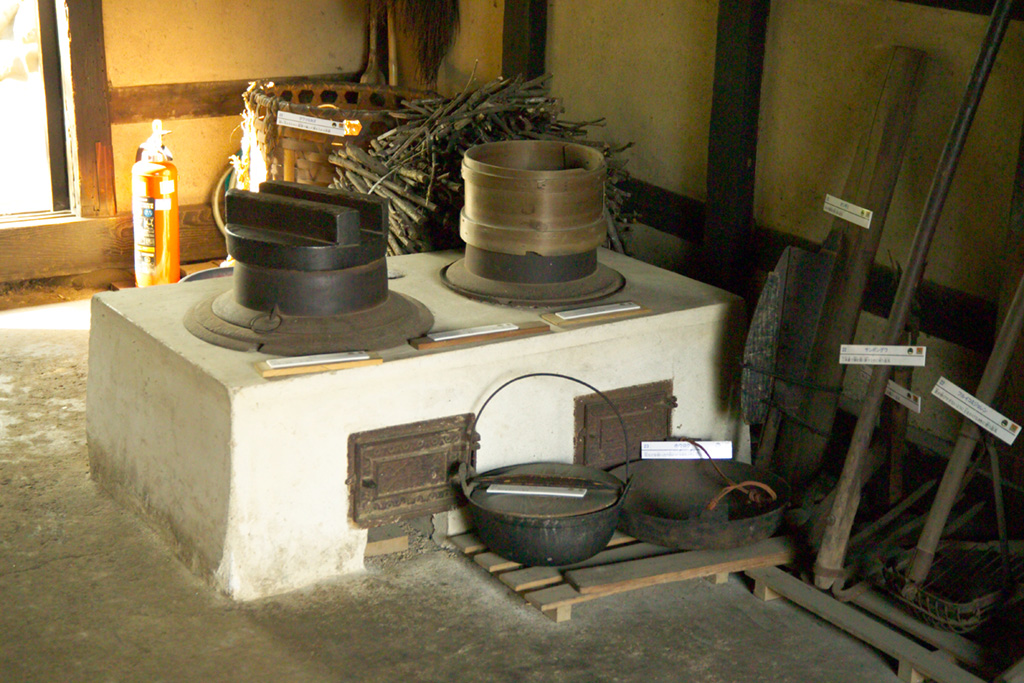
A traditional kamado in a Japanese museum

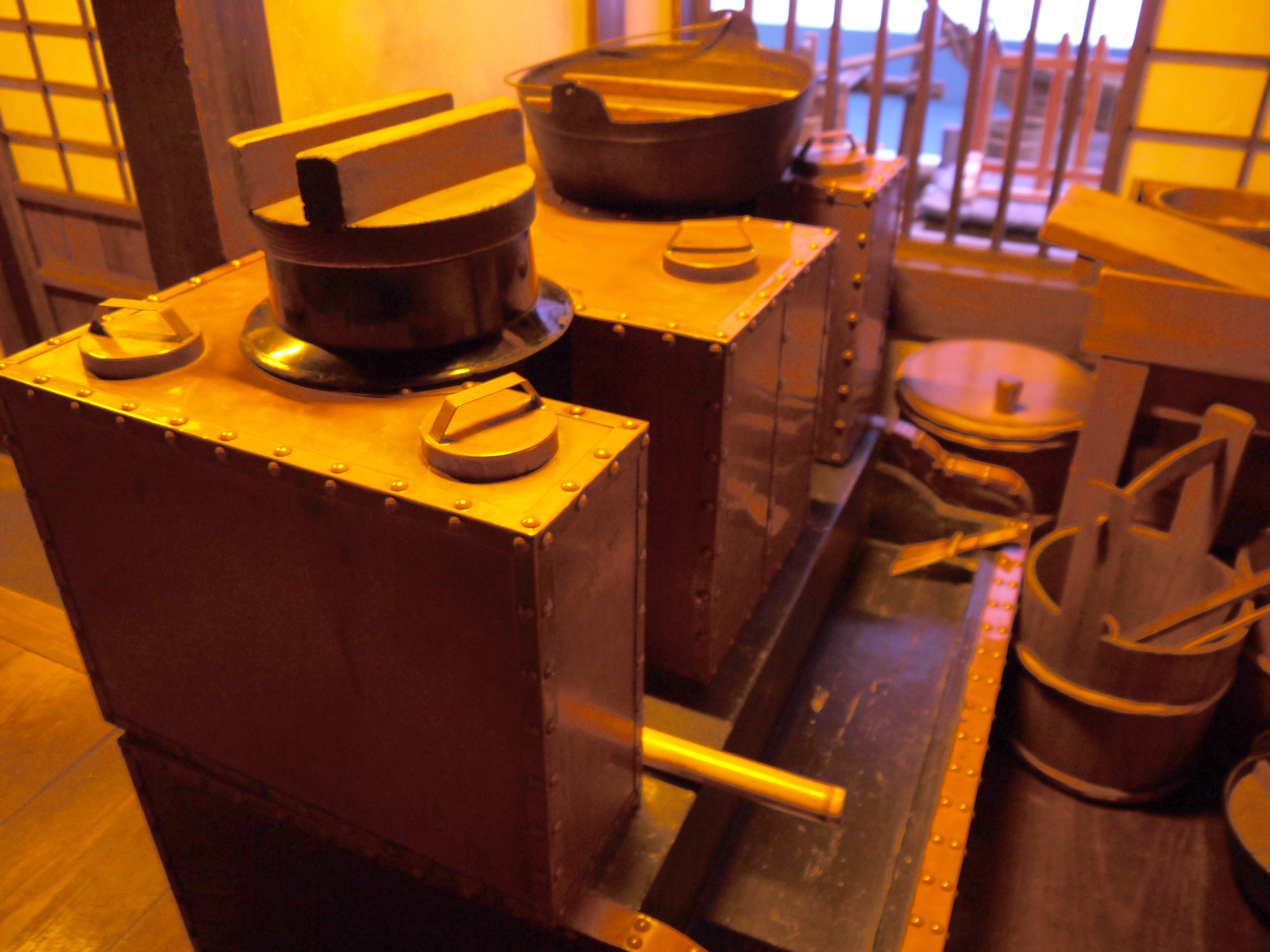
The 18th-century Merchant's kitchen, stove boiler or kamado made of copper (Fukagawa Edo Museum)

A kamado (竈, 竃 or 灶) is a traditional Japanese wood- or charcoal-fueled cook stove.

== Etymology and history ==
The precursor of the kamado was introduced to Japan by Yayoi immigrants from the Korean peninsula during the Kofun period. The name kamado is the Japanese word for "stove" or "cooking range". It means a "place for the cauldron". A movable kamado called mushikamado came to the attention of Americans after World War II. It is now found in the US as a kamado-style cooker or barbecue grill. The mushikamado is a round clay pot with a removable domed clay lid and is typically found in Southern Japan.

The kanji character for kamado is 竈. The kanji character may be the best name to use when searching for information about traditional unmovable kamado. Elsewhere, the word kamado has become a generic term for ceramic or unfired-clay cookstoves.

== Mushikamado ==
=== Construction ===
Mushikamado are made from a variety of materials including high fire ceramics, refractory materials, double wall insulated steel, traditional terra cotta, or a mix of Portland cement and crushed lava.

Outer surfaces vary from a high gloss ceramic glaze, paint, a textured stucco-like surface or ceramic tiles. Modern ceramic and refractory materials decrease cracking – a common fault in the original design, and still a factor in Portland cement designs. In addition to the outer ceramic shell, a ceramic or stainless steel bowl inside the unit holds charcoal. One or more grids are suspended over the fire to provide the cooking surface(s) for food. A draft opening in the lower side of the unit provides air to the fuel, as well as a controllable vent in the top of the dome lid for air to exit the cooker. Temperature is controlled by adjusting these two vents, which in most kamado-style cookers can be monitored through a hole in the lid. Digital temperature control devices can be installed using a small blower to regulate airflow. High-end kamado have layers of insulation that create low-airflow cooking conditions and are self-opening.

=== Fuel ===
Mushikamado grills are generally fueled by charcoal but may burn dry twigs, straw or wood. However, attempts have been made to fire them with gas, electricity, or pellets. One of the claims for ceramic construction is it does not affect flavor (no metallic taste) and, for the same reasoning, lump wood charcoal produces little ash and is preferred.

=== Uses ===
Mushikamado is designed to steam rice and it is used by Japanese families for ceremonial occasions. It is versatile and can be used for grilling and smoking. Flat-bread, such as pizza, can be cooked on a flat ceramic or stone tray (pizza stone). This is by virtue of the heat retention properties of the ceramic shell with temperatures up to 750 °F (400 °C). Precise control of airflow (and thus temperature) afforded by the vent system means kamado-style cookers are much like wood-fired ovens and can be used to roast and bake. Kamado may have a rotisserie cradle for crisping the skin of birds and uniform browning.

== See also ==
- Agungi/Buttumak
- Brazier
- Crucible
- Firebox
- Hearth
- Hibachi
- Japanese kitchen
- Kama (Japanese tea ceremony)
- Kitchen stove
- Russian stove
- Wash copper
- Weber grill
- Wok stove
- Wood-burning stove
