= Transparent heating film =

Type of polymer film

Transparent heating film, also called transparent heating plastic or heating transparent polymer film is a thin and flexible polymer film with a conductive optical coating. Transparent heating films may be rated at 2.5 kW/m^{2} at voltages below 48 volts direct current (V DC). This allows heating with secure transformers delivering voltages which will not hurt the human body. Transparent conductive polymer films may be used for heating transparent glasses. A combination with transparent SMD electronic for multipurpose applications, is also possible. It is also a variant of carbon heating film.

== See also ==
- Optical coating
