= Haengnangchae =

Traditional space in Korean houses

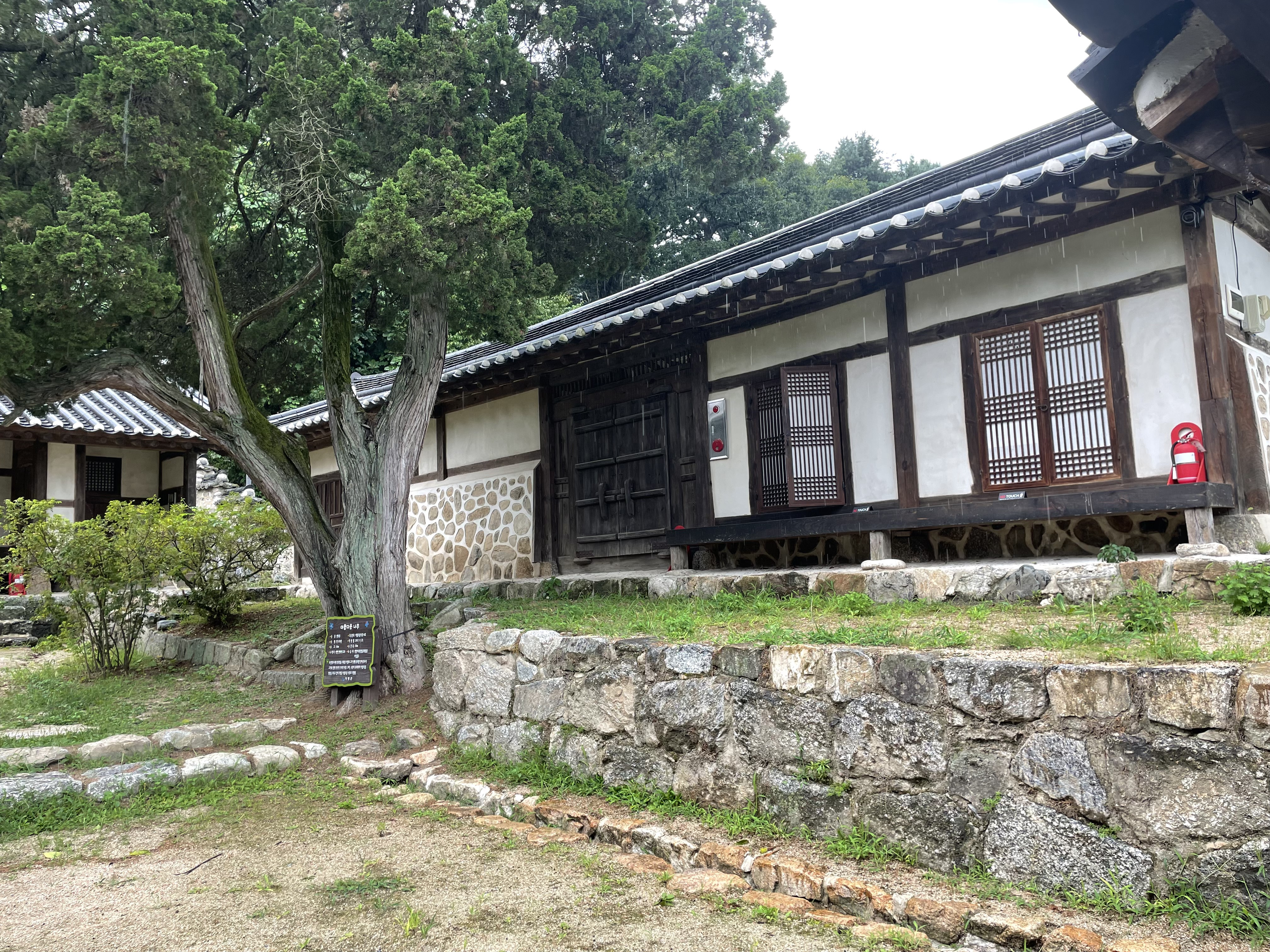
Haengnangchae in Icheonbo Old House

Haengnangchae (Korean: 행랑채) is a Korean residential space attached to both sides of the main gate. It was commonly built in houses as well as palaces and government offices during the Joseon Dynasty. It was mainly used as a place for people who ran errands or as storage for various purposes.

== Etymology ==
Haengnang (행랑; 行廊) refers to a room attached to the main gate. Haengnangchae refers to a house with a haengnang room.

== History ==
It usually consists of a stable, a room for servants, and a storehouse centered around the main gate, and is often built along the boundary of a house. It was commonly built in houses, palaces, and government buildings during the Joseon Dynasty, and was mainly used as a place for people running errands or as a storage space. The structure of the servants' quarters is a simple wooden structure with three bays. The size of each room is usually about 1 or 2 bays.

The floors are made of ondol where people live, and some are made of wooden floors, while the rest are made of dirt. The walls are made of mud where they face the road or the outside, but in upper-class houses or palaces, they are made of stone with small windows at the top.
