= Wash copper =

Type of wash house boiler

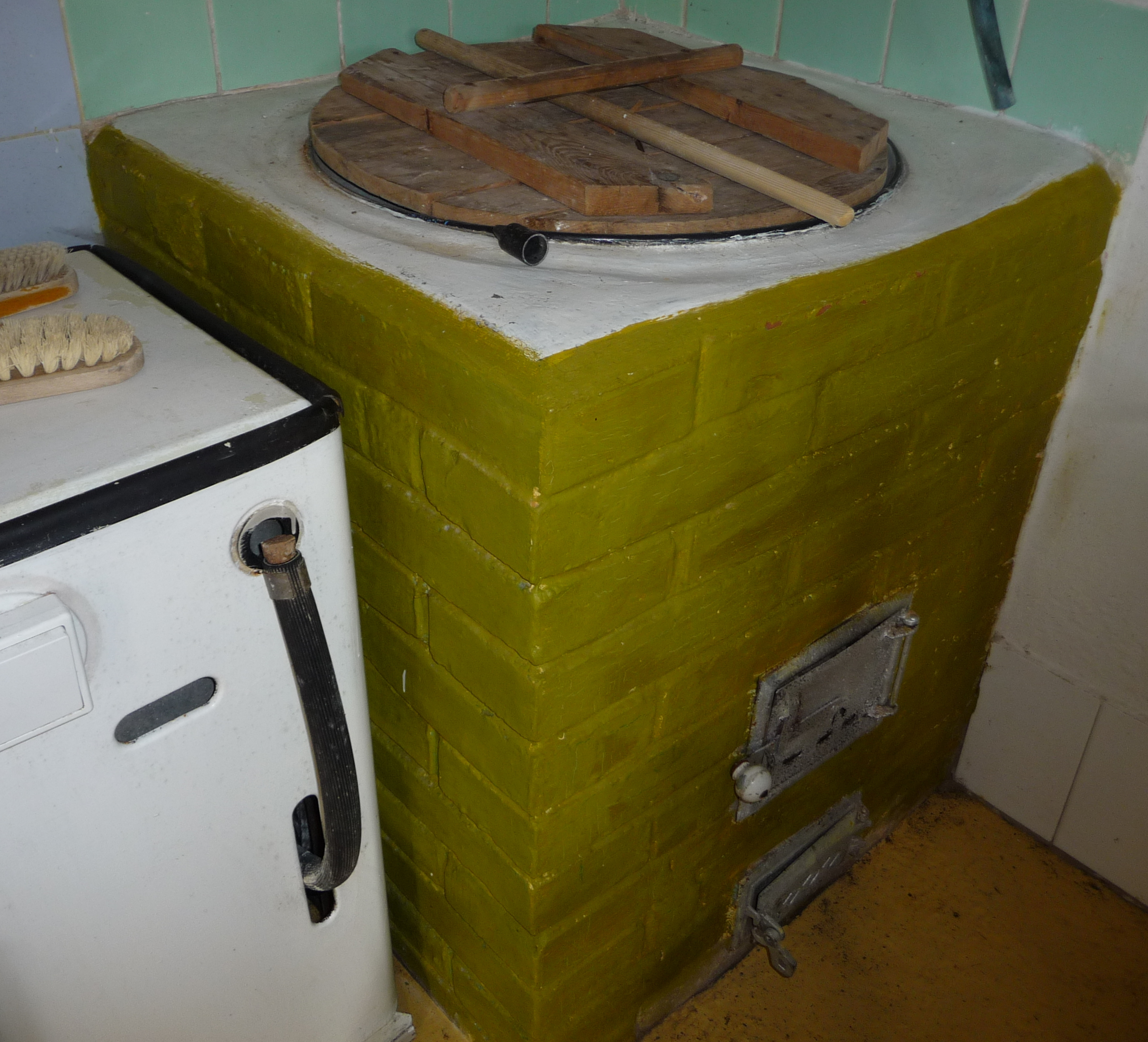
A laundry copper

A wash copper, copper boiler or simply copper is a wash house boiler, generally made of galvanised iron, though the best sorts are made of copper. In the inter-war years they came in two types. The first is built into a brickwork furnace and was found in older houses. The second was the free-standing or portable type, it had an enamelled metal exterior that supported the inner can or copper. The bottom part was adapted to hold a gas burner, a high pressure oil or an ordinary wood or coal fire. Superior models could have a drawing-off tap, and a steam-escape pipe that led into the flue.

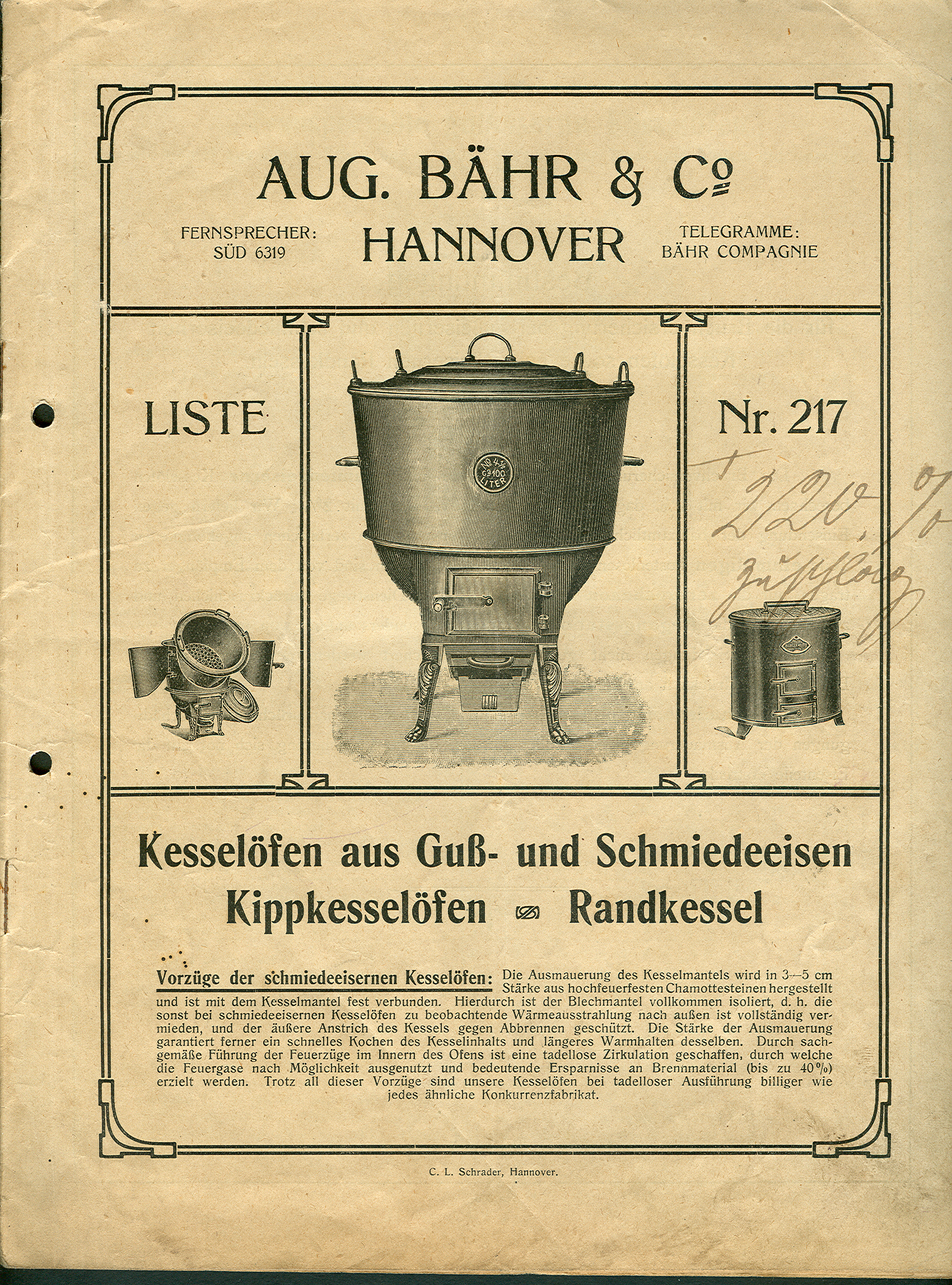
An invoice for a free-standing Kesselofen

It was used for domestic laundry. Linen and cotton were placed in the copper and were boiled to whiten them. Clothes were agitated within the copper with a washing dolly, a vertical stick with either a metal cone or short wooden legs on it. After washing, the laundry was lifted out of the boiling water using the washing dolly or a similar device, and placed on a strainer resting on a laundry tub or similar container to capture the wash water and begin the drying and cooling process. The laundry was then dried with a mangle and then line-dried.

Coppers could also be used in cooking, used to boil puddings such as a traditional Christmas pudding.

Meticulous care was taken to avoid rust, and grease. In cases of the latter it could be cleaned with paraffin or soft soap. Water was always put in the copper before it was lit. In the case of solid fuel, a small shovel of hot coals would be brought from the main kitchen fire and coke shovelled on top.

== See also ==
- Russian stove
- Kamado (Japanese)
  - Furo
- Agungi/Buttumak (Korean)
