= Gloria (heating system) =

Heating system used in Castile, Spain

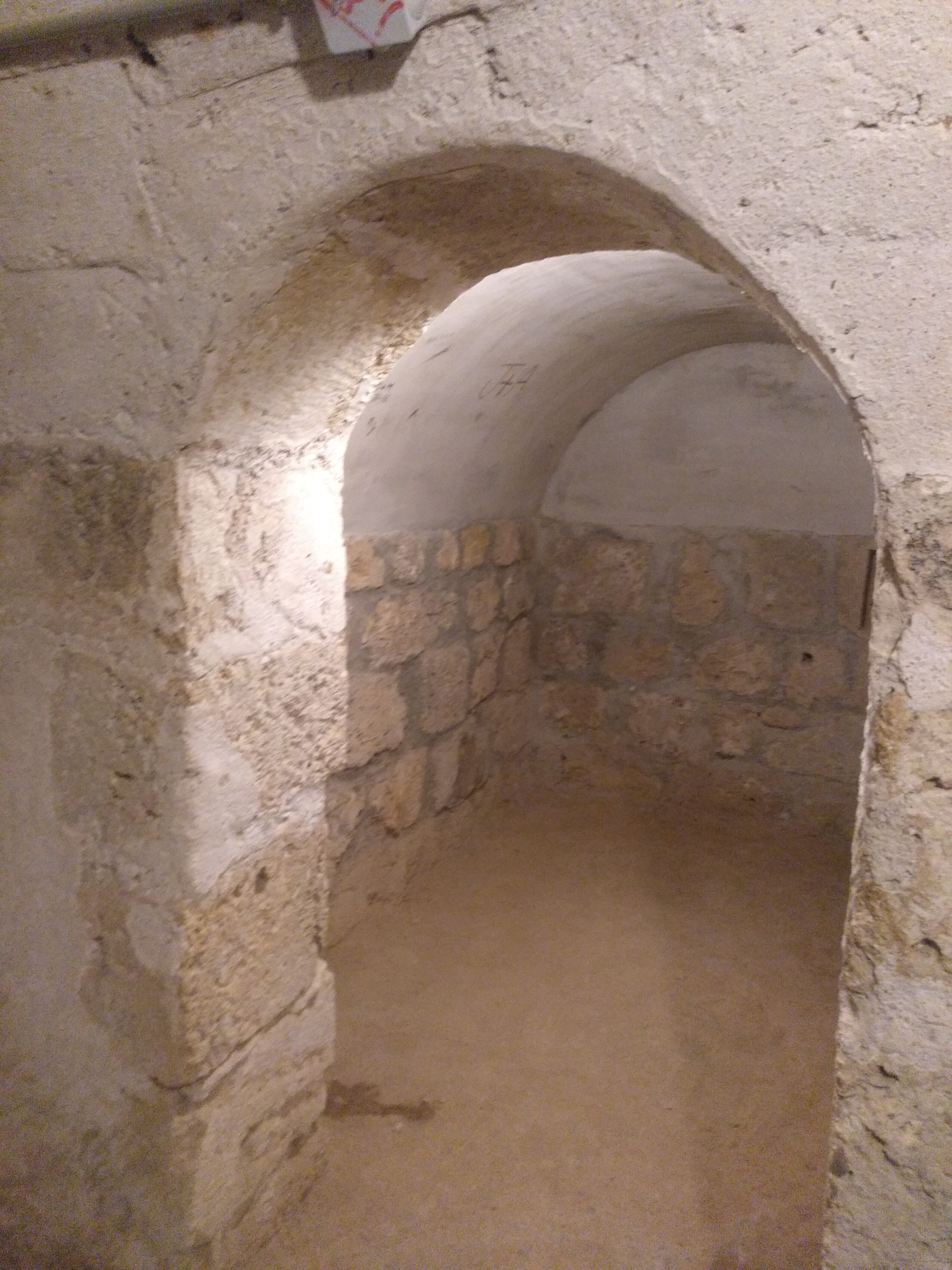
Interior of the gloria of Monasterio de Piedra, Spain

Gloria (meaning glory in Spanish) is a central heating system used in Castile, beginning in the Middle Ages. It is a direct descendant of the Roman hypocaust, and its feature of regulating the rate of combustion allows people to use smaller, cheaper materials for fuel, such as leaves, hay, or twigs, instead of wood.

== Description ==
The gloria consists of a firebox, generally located outside (in a courtyard, for example), which burns the fuel, and one or more ducts which run under the floors of the rooms to be heated. The warm exhaust gases from the combustion pass through these ducts and then are released outside through a vertical flue.

Historically, glorias used pine needles for fuel and pine cones for kindling, in both cases using what would otherwise be waste material, saving firewood for cooking and smithing, as well as hay and silage for animal fodder.

The rate of combustion (and therefore the heat output) can be regulated by restricting the airflow into the firebox. Moreover, the air required for combustion does not have to pass through the interior of the building, which reduces cold drafts. Finally, because the firebox is not open to the interior, there is no risk of filling the interior with smoke. An additional benefit lies in the ability to cool the building by opening the structure without firing it.

The gloria continues to be used in the Meseta Central, especially in Castile and León.

The modern equivalent of the gloria would be underfloor heating using piped hot water under the floor to heat rooms.

== See also ==
- Hypocaust, the Roman precursor of the gloria
- Ondol, a similar system used in Korea
- Heat storage hypocaust, another European derivative of the hypocaust
