= Gamasot =

Traditional Korea pots

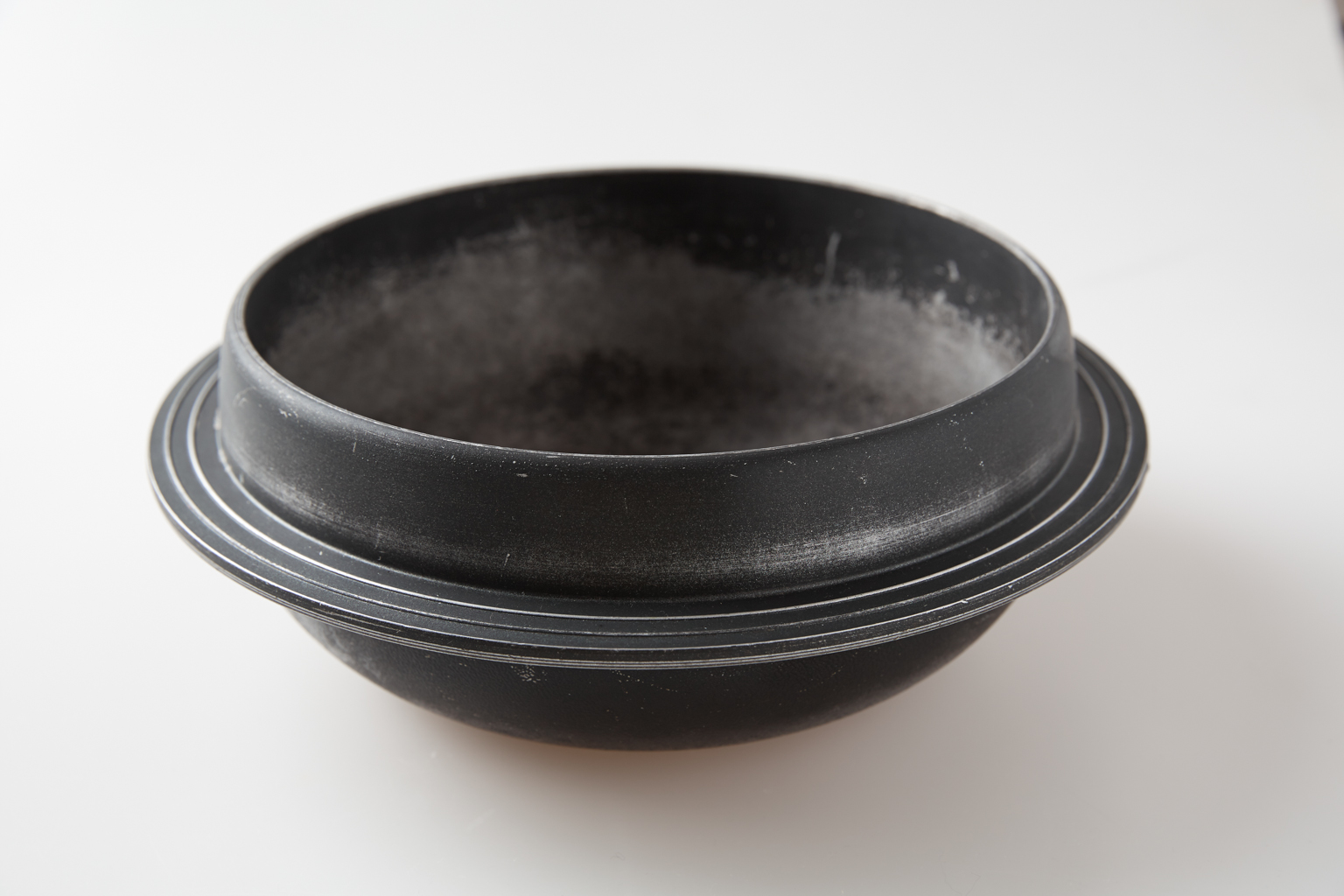

Korean name
- Hangul: 가마솥; 솥
- RR: gamasot; sot
- MR: kamasot; sot
- IPA: ka.ma.sot̚; sot̚

Gamasot (Korean: 가마솥), or simply sot (솥), is a large, heavy pot or cauldron commonly used in Korean cuisine.

== Origin ==
The modern Korean sot descends from the bronze three legged cauldron, known in Korea as jeong.

Bronze sot are frequently unearthed as remains of the Three Kingdoms period, because jeongs were symbolic of the nation, the throne, and industry. However, the history of the iron sot goes back much earlier than the Three Kingdoms period. The copper sot on the Korean Peninsula were first discovered in the remains of Gojoseon, which corresponds to the Liaoning bronze dagger culture of the late Bronze Age. A large number of sot were excavated from the ruins of the Four Commanderies of Han, which was installed when Gojoseon was destroyed by Han in 108 BCE. In particular, the ruins of the Lelang Commandery are famous for the being the source of the largest variety of pots.

== Shape ==
It was very large and recessed to fit the large family of Korea. In general, gama mean utensils when lighting a fire, and sot means pot and bowl that cook rice. The gamasot has no legs and the bottom of the pot is round and usually has a small recess at the edge of the entrance. There are four projections on the body, which is convenient to put across the stove. The lid is made of iron, and it has a convenient tap in the middle.

== History ==
From ancient times, the pot was not simply a device for cooking food, but a symbol of kingship, power, state, and industry. It was used as a tool to record the achievements of public figures or to punish corrupt officials, religious ceremonies, or food for the dead.

Cooking rice in gamasot is a longstanding custom in Korea, that began at least during the reign of King Daemusin (18‒44 CE) in Goguryeo.

== Usage ==
In the hanok's kitchen, agungi can be used for heating and cooking, and gamasot is a large pot designed for use as a cooking utensil. Gamasot is very large, so it is common to use it almost fixed to agungi. Gamasot is a Korean traditional pot that has kept its kitchen for a long time. There were few places where it is not used, such as making fire, cooking rice, frying the side dishes and steaming. The closest thing to real life was gamasot. It is an important cooking tool that can not be used for cooking in Korea. Therefore, the pot was a history of the family.

== Gallery ==
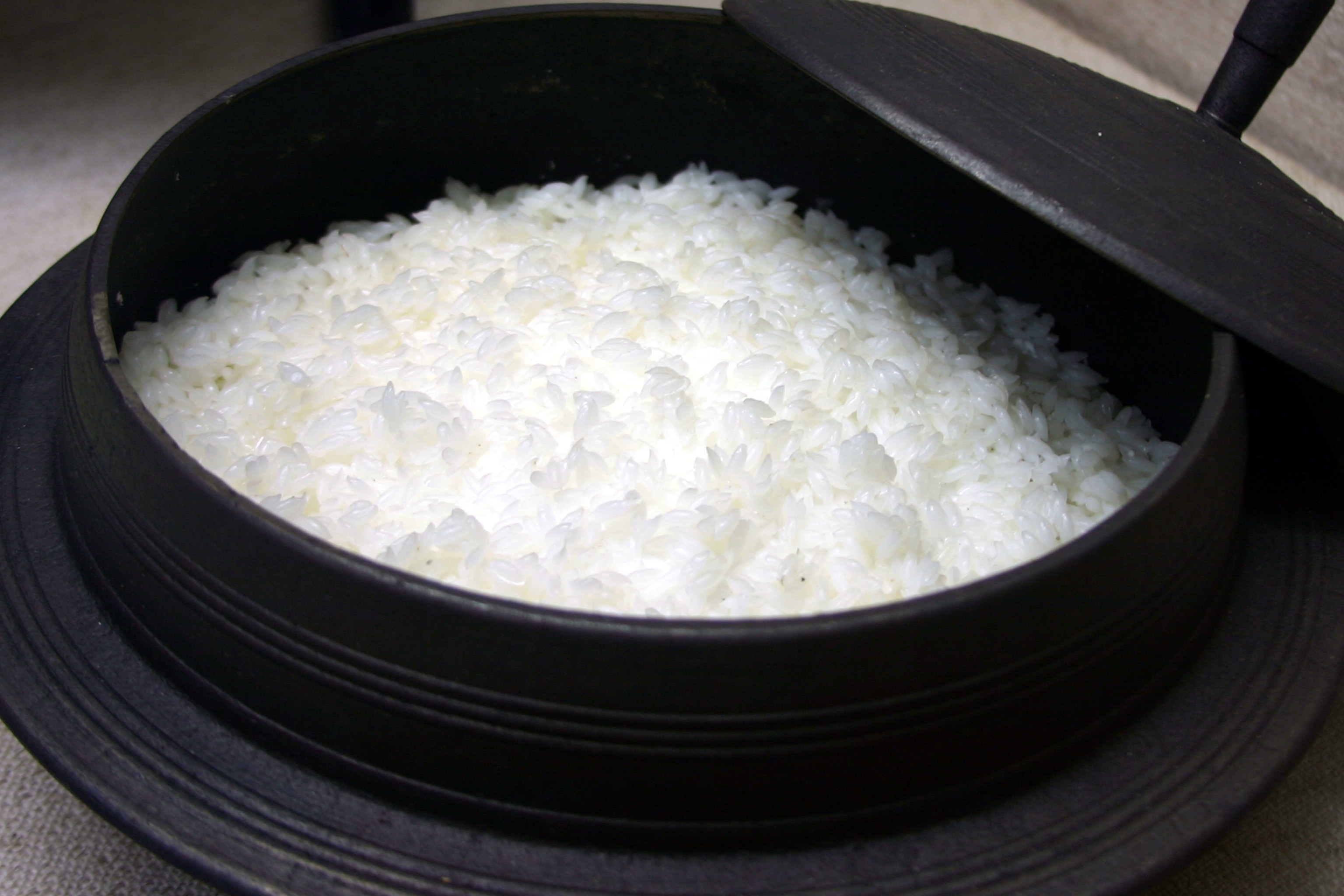
Sotbap, rice cooked in gamasot

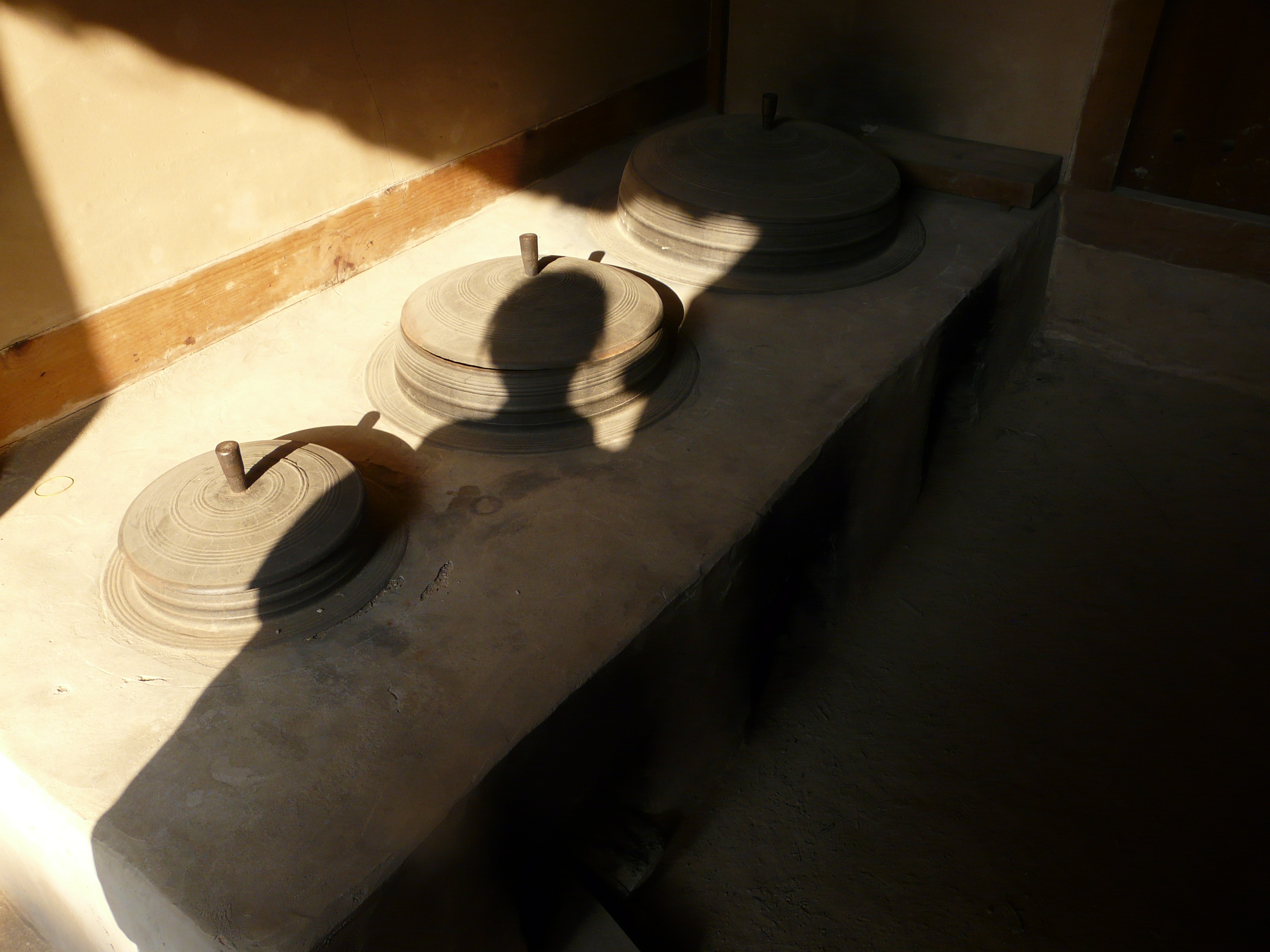
Gamasot (Ansan Cultural Center, Ansan)

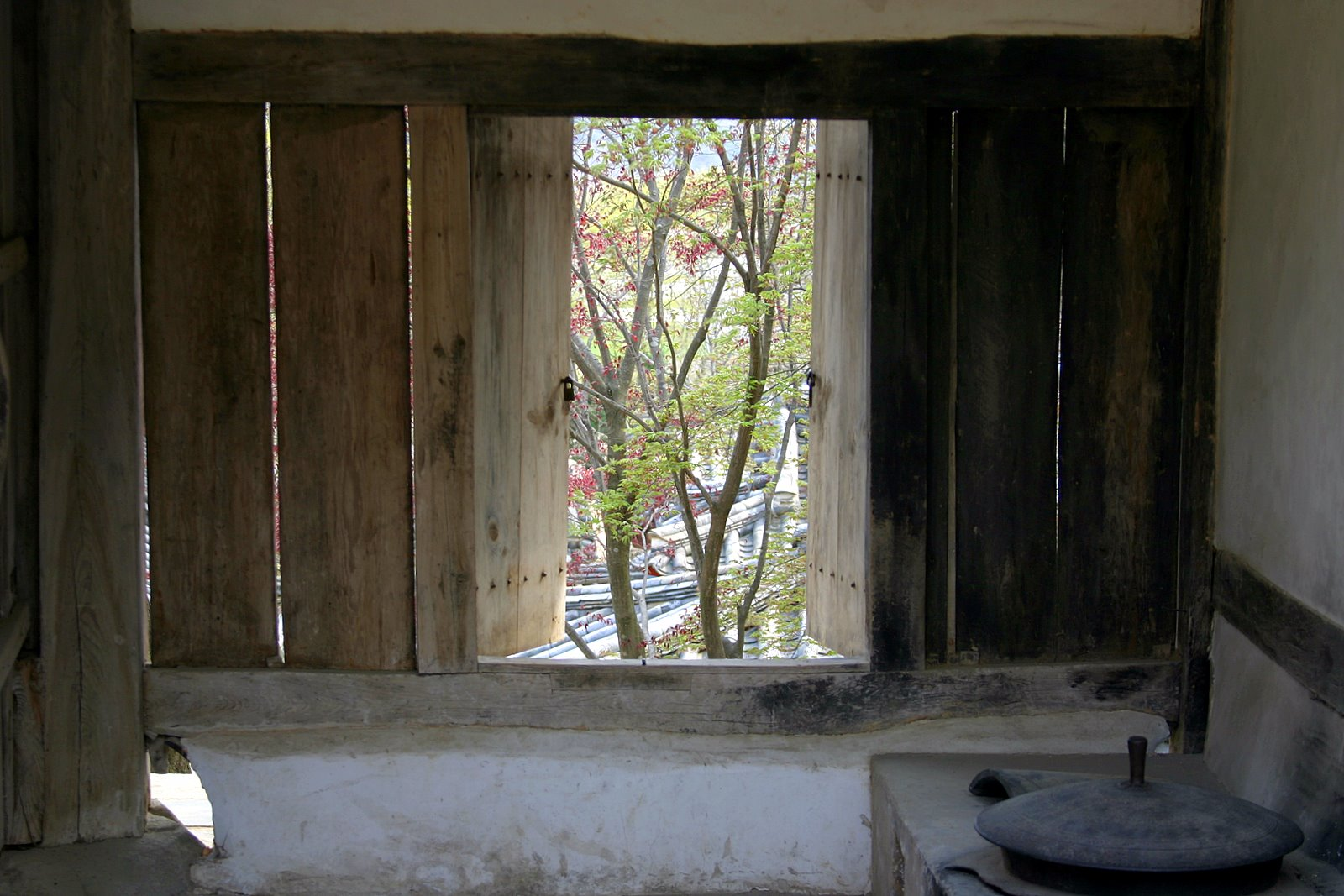
Traditional Korean kitchen with gamasot (Dosan Seowon, Andong)

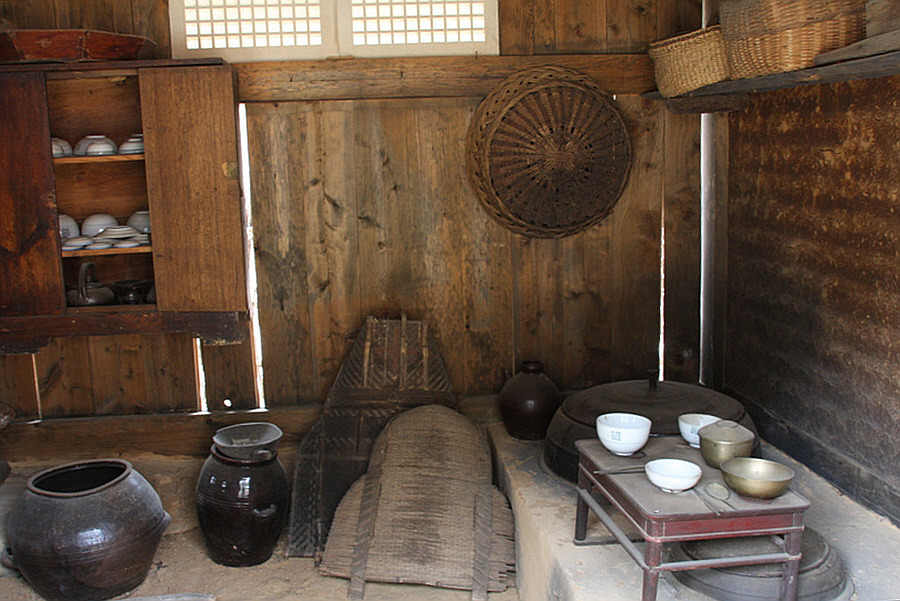
Miners' kitchen with gamasot (Cheonpo Gold Mine Village, Jeongseon)

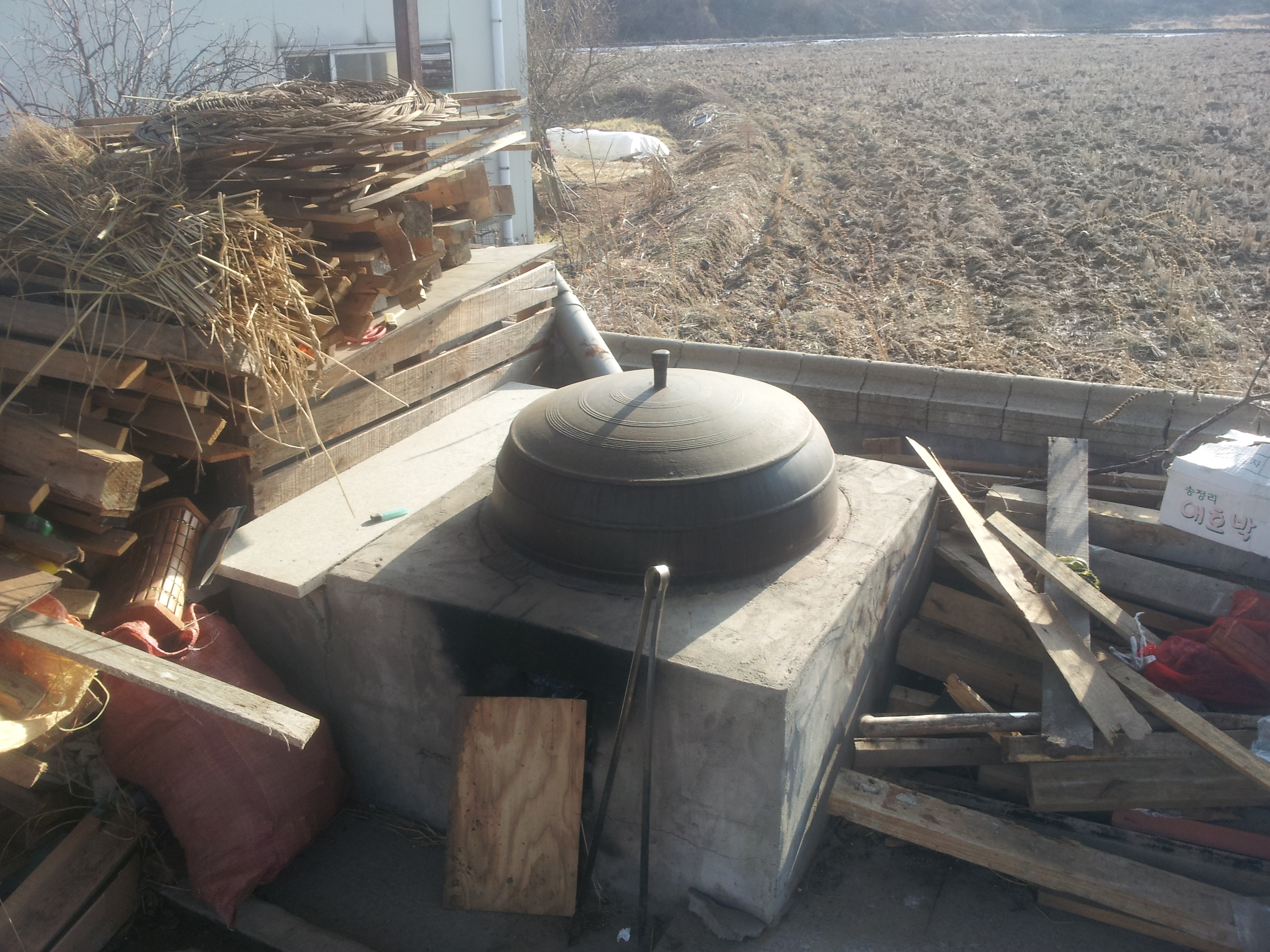
Gamasot and agungi

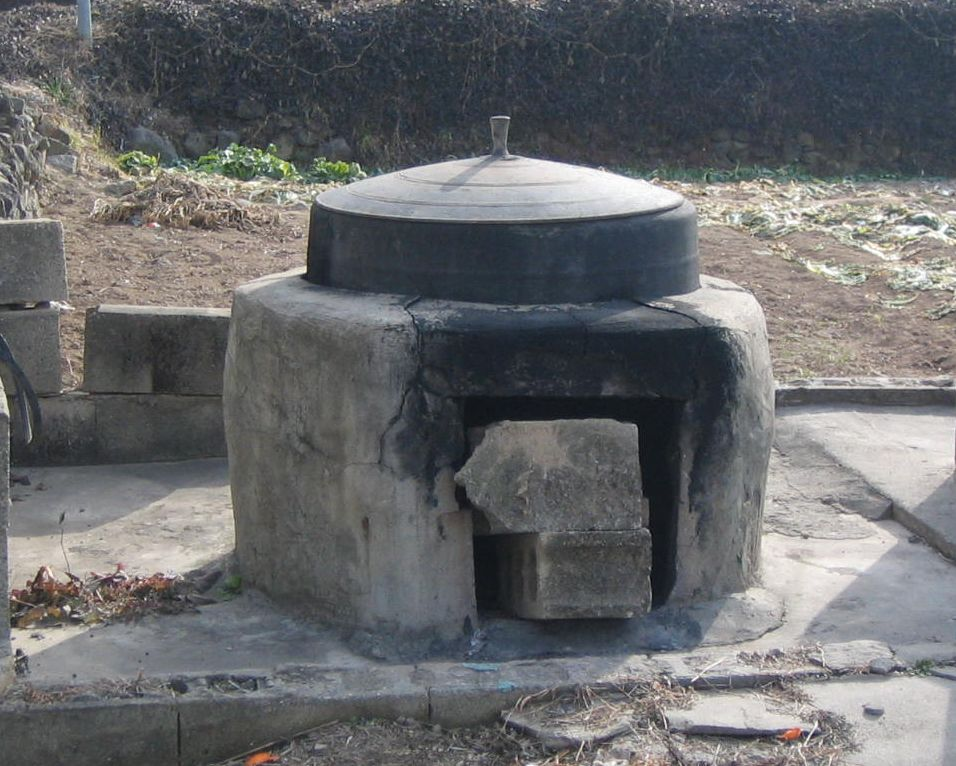
Gamasot in Miryang

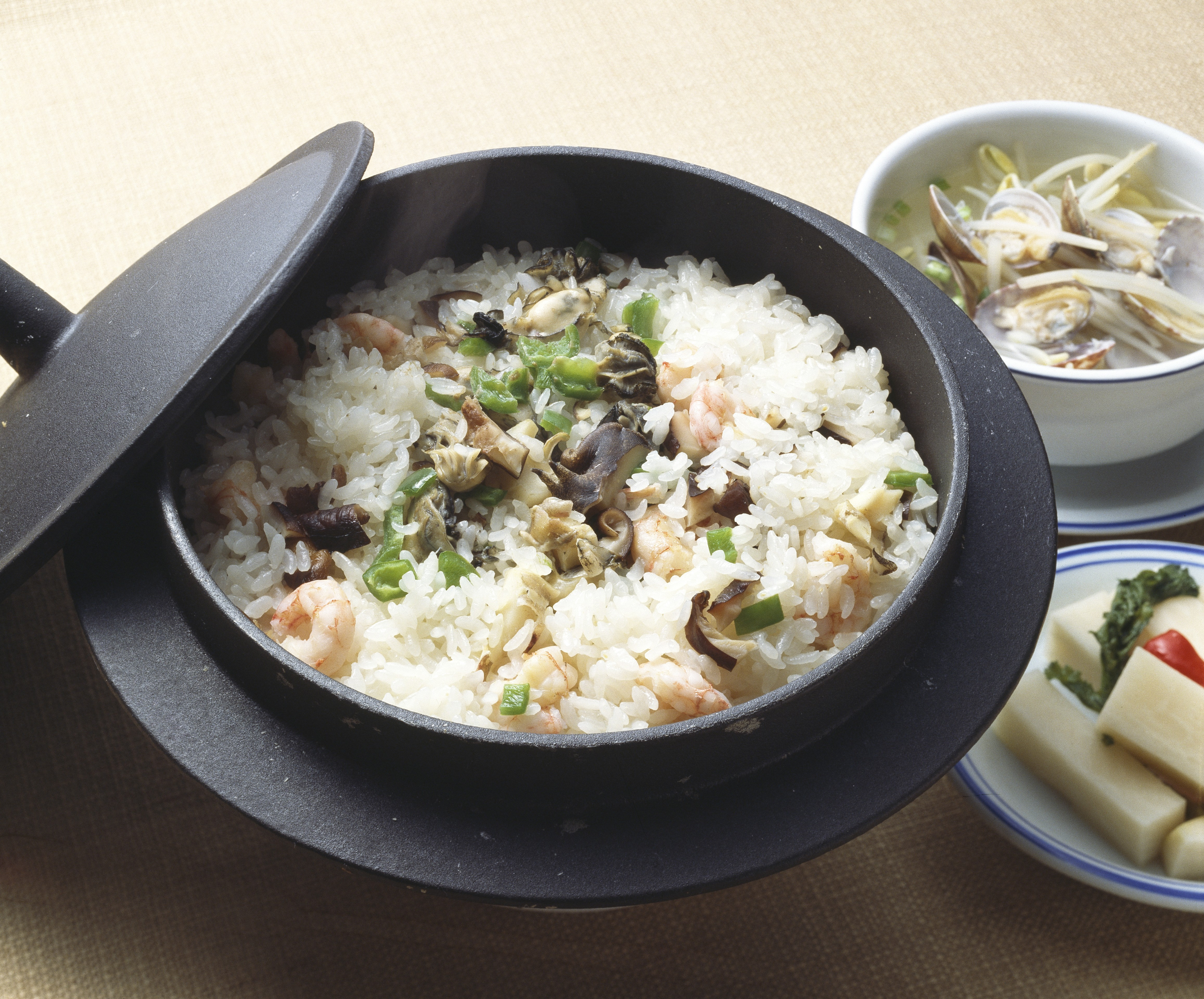
Sotbap, cooked rice in Gamasot

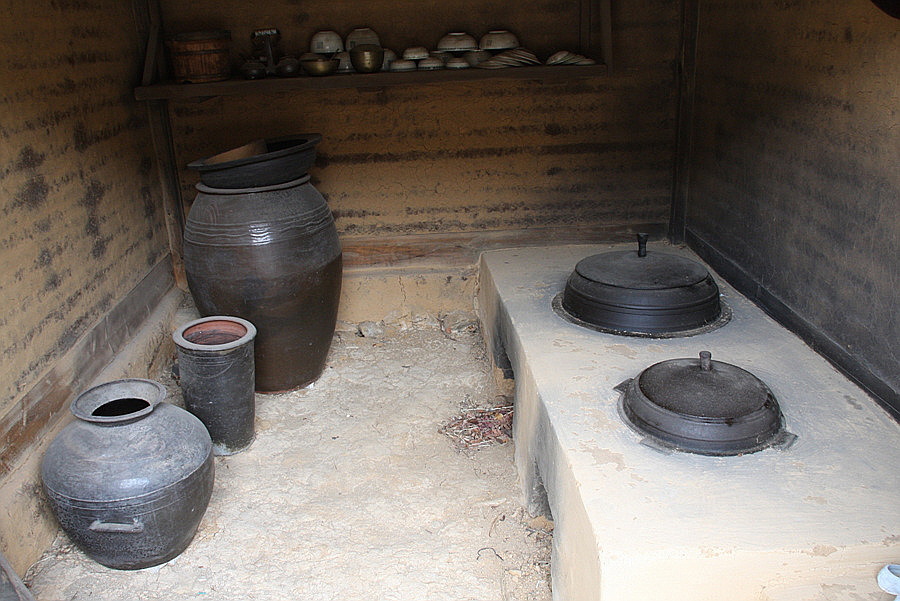
Gamasot in a kitchen for gold miners

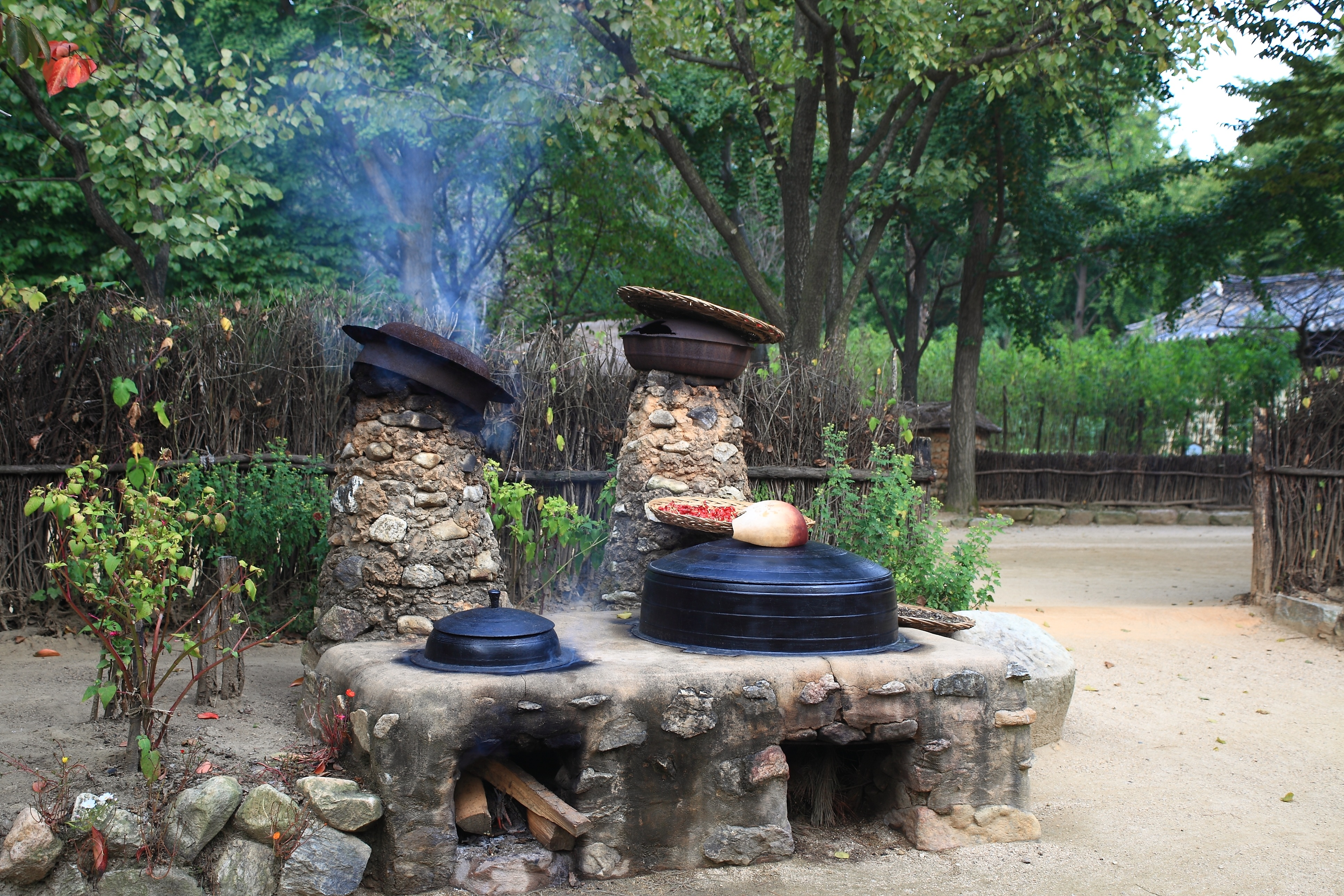
Gamasot located outside

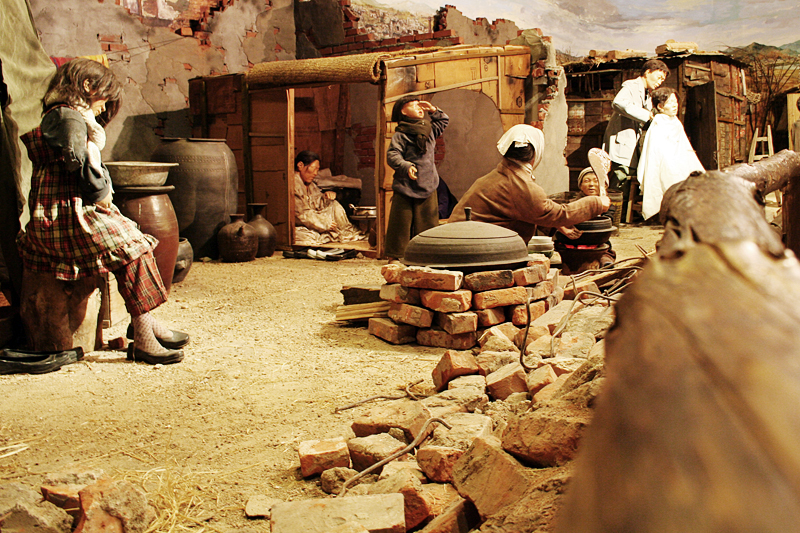
A large gamasot used during the Korean War

== See also ==
- Dolsot
- List of cooking vessels
