= Heating film =

Method of heating buildings

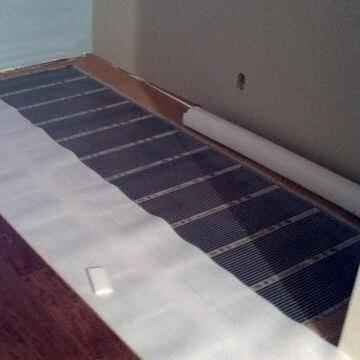
A set of heating film before installation

Heating films are a method of electric resistance heating, providing relatively low temperatures (compared to many conventional heating systems) over large areas. Heating films can be directly installed to provide underfloor heating, wall radiant heating and ceiling radiant heating.

The films can also be used in heating panels to produce wall or ceiling panel heaters.

Although heating films do not usually run at very high temperatures (typically 30 °C (86 °F) on floors and up to 40 °C (104 °F) on walls), due to the large surface area they cover, they can provide significant energy output. Also due to the low temperature, undesirable heat losses can be lower, when compared to higher temperature wet heating systems with losses from long pipe runs from the central heating source.

== Description ==
Electric resistance heating films consist of a substrate film, most commonly made from plastic, printed or coated with a resistance material and electric contact busbars. This is laminated or coated with another layer of insulating film, usually similar to the substrate.

Electrical contacts can be made using various types of crimp contacts, which make contact through the covering films to the internal busbars. If the operating voltage is high enough, the contacts must be additionally insulated and additional safety insulation or safety earth covering must be provided over the film to protect users from shock, in case of damage to the installed film.

Heating films can be used as a replacement for conventional heating systems, as a primary heat source or used to augment existing systems.

Due to the simplicity of installation and ease of hiding the installation, it can be popular with DIY installers. The films can be placed or removed when needed, when installed under carpets of other easily removable floor covering. Heating controllers can allow the residents to select which surface will be heated.

Films are available with different power outputs per m2. The required power output will depend on the area covered, building insulation, required energy input to the room and maximum desired surface temperature. Many countries have regulations for the maximum floor or wall temperature. Thermostats with surface temperature sensors may be required in these jurisdictions.

This heating system is mainly used in Asian countries like Korea, where it is considered as a modern version of ondol heating. Some heating films are semi-permanent, meaning that they need to be changed after a certain period of use, and are not widely available everywhere. However, many modern heating films can be considered permanent, lasting at least 20 years with no degradation in performance.

Heating films are becoming increasingly popular globally

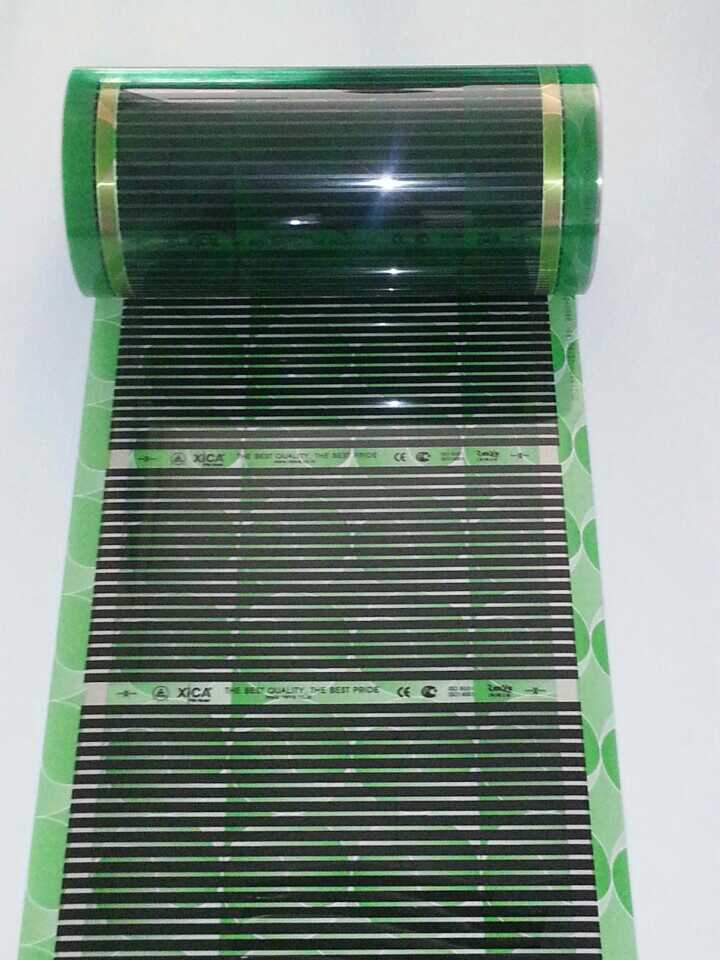
A heating film roll

== Ondol radiant floor heating ==
An ondol, also called gudeul (Korean: 구들), in Korean traditional architecture, is underfloor heating which uses direct heat transfer from wood smoke to the underside of a thick masonry floor. Many modern Korean houses use a radiant underfloor heating system that's called ondol, referring to the traditional ondol heating system. In fact, Korean people refer to any domestic heating system as ondol.

Technically, the modern day ondol is based on the same concept as the underfloor radiant heating invented by the American architect Frank Lloyd Wright, who was interested in Japanese architecture. Wright came with the idea while visiting a Japanese nobleman's house, where he found a tea room that was different from the rest of the house, using a Korean ondol as a heating system. He then took the same idea to create a heating system that fits American houses. Wright invented modern radiant floor heating, using hot water running through pipes instead of hot air through flues.

A heating film, itself, is a variation of the modern ondol, but it doesn't require hot water and pipes as it is fully electric. There are also many variations of this underfloor heating system, as many underfloor heaters are based on PTC heating element, far-infrared rays, carbon film, or cables, etc.

== Operating voltage ==
Heating films for domestic heating are available to be powered directly from the mains electricity supply in different countries, e.g. 120 volts AC, 220 volts AC, etc. or low voltage, e.g. 24 volts.

=== Mains voltage ===
In general, due to safety issues, heating films supplied directly from the mains are only installed underfloor or in ceilings. Due to potentially hazardous voltages from mains electricity, protection from electric shock is usually required, either due to damage (e.g. nails) or water ingress. Most commonly, additional insulation layers are added over the heating film and sealed with waterproof tapes, although this does not provide protection from shock due to damage like nails. Metalised bags or sheets, connected to earth can also be used, relying on earth leakage (RCD) protection devices on the mains supply to provide protection from shock due to damage.

Due to the additional protection layers, the heating efficiency of mains films can be reduced, however the lack of power supply makes these types of heating film attractive.

=== Low voltage ===
Low voltage heating films are usually designed to function at voltages within SELV range and therefore present no danger of shock. Operation at such voltages means that the films have many fewer limitations on where and how they can be installed, however higher currents are required for operation, requiring thicker wires and voltage converting isolation transformers or power supplies to run from the local mains. Alternatively, low voltage heating films may be suitable for off grid installations where battery, solar, wind or other power is available at the required voltage and current.

Low voltage heating films can be particularly suitable for use in wet areas, where water ingress is a possibility.

Low voltage heating films are also suitable for installation on walls to provide radiant heating. These films can include surface finishes designed to take plaster coatings directly onto the installed film. Due to the low voltage, they are completely electric shock safe when damaged due to nails, screws or when other fittings are put directly through the film. Breaks in the resistive film will affect the power output and metal bridges could cause excessive localised heating due to increased current flow and should not be made across breaks in the film. Breaks in the busbars would also cause functional issues.

It is also possible to install low voltage heating films connected directly to the mains, by connecting sufficient of the sheets in series. However, in this case, similar insulation and shock protection would be required as for mains film installations.

Heating films installed in walls and ceilings, provide heating predominantly using infrared or far infrared radiation, directly to the occupants of a room. Underfloor heating can also provides radiant heat, but floor coverings must be selected to provide infrared transmission and heat conduction.

== Greenhouse gas emissions of heating film ==
The greenhouse gas emissions of heating film is split between manufacture, shipping, installation and operational emissions.

=== Manufacture ===
Due to variations between the construction of heating films from different manufacturers, calculations for greenhouse gas emissions to manufacture the products should be made for each manufacturer's film.

Most heating films use plastic films, typically PET. These films can be produced from various sources, including recycling, which should be taken into account. Even where the plastic is recycled or derived from renewable sources, energy will be required to produce it and this must be accounted for.

The resistance layer can be made in many different ways. Typically it is carbon based, with various other chemicals to make it adhere to the substrate sheet. All of these components must be accounted for when considering manufacturing emissions.

The copper busbars, although small, will be a source of emissions. The copper may be printed as particles, which will require suitable chemicals to provide adhesion or stuck on as a ribbon, which will also require suitable adhesive chemicals. Silver particles may also be used to provide additional conductivity between the copper and resistance layer.

=== Shipping ===
Heating films are lightweight, typically 200 to 300 grams per square metre (0.061 lb/sq ft). Greenhouse gas emissions due to shipping will depend on distance travelled and transport method. Assuming the heating film travels a similar distance to other heating systems from manufacturer to installation, due to its comparatively low weight, emissions to ship heating film will be comparatively lower.

=== Installation ===
Installation of heating films will consume almost no energy when installed underfloor. Where adhesives are used for installation, e.g. on walls and ceilings, the emissions involved in manufacturing and shipping the adhesive must also be included. Some adhesives can produce environmentally damaging emissions as they cure. Low emission adhesives should be used or these emissions must be taken into account when considering installation emissions.

Wiring could also add emissions, where cable runs through walls and floors need to be provided.

=== Operating emissions ===
Since heating films are powered by electricity, no direct emissions will occur at the installation. The operating emissions will depend entirely on the electricity source and emissions will occur wherever the electricity is generated.

E.g. where the heating film is supplied directly by nuclear, wind or solar energy, the greenhouse gas emissions will be zero. Where the electricity is supplied by mains electricity in a region where the electricity is produced from coal, the overall operating greenhouse gas emission will be high.

However, most countries are aiming to reduce greenhouse gas emissions for electricity generation. In countries where these policies are in place, heating film supplied from the mains can be considered to produce lower greenhouse gas emissions than coal, oil or gas heating systems and this will tend to improve over time.

== Transparent heating film ==
Transparent heating films are a variant of the basic heating films but are built according to a different architecture. It consists of a thin and flexible polymer film with a conductive optical coating. These heating films can be used in museums as a replacement for heating tables

== Enhanced heating film with PTC technology ==
Some infrared heating films can be enhanced with PTC technology, also known as Positive Temperature Coefficient technology. In this type of film, the electrical resistance increases as the film temperature rises. This allows the heating output to reduce naturally when the film reaches a higher temperature, helping to stabilise surface temperature and reduce the risk of local overheating.

PTC-enhanced heating film is therefore often described as self-regulating. Compared with standard resistive heating film, it can provide improved temperature control, more consistent heat distribution and an additional level of thermal protection. However, correct system design, thermostat control, insulation, electrical installation and compatibility with the surrounding materials remain important for safe and efficient operation.
