= Hearth =

Place for a fire to heat the home and to cook food, usually of masonry

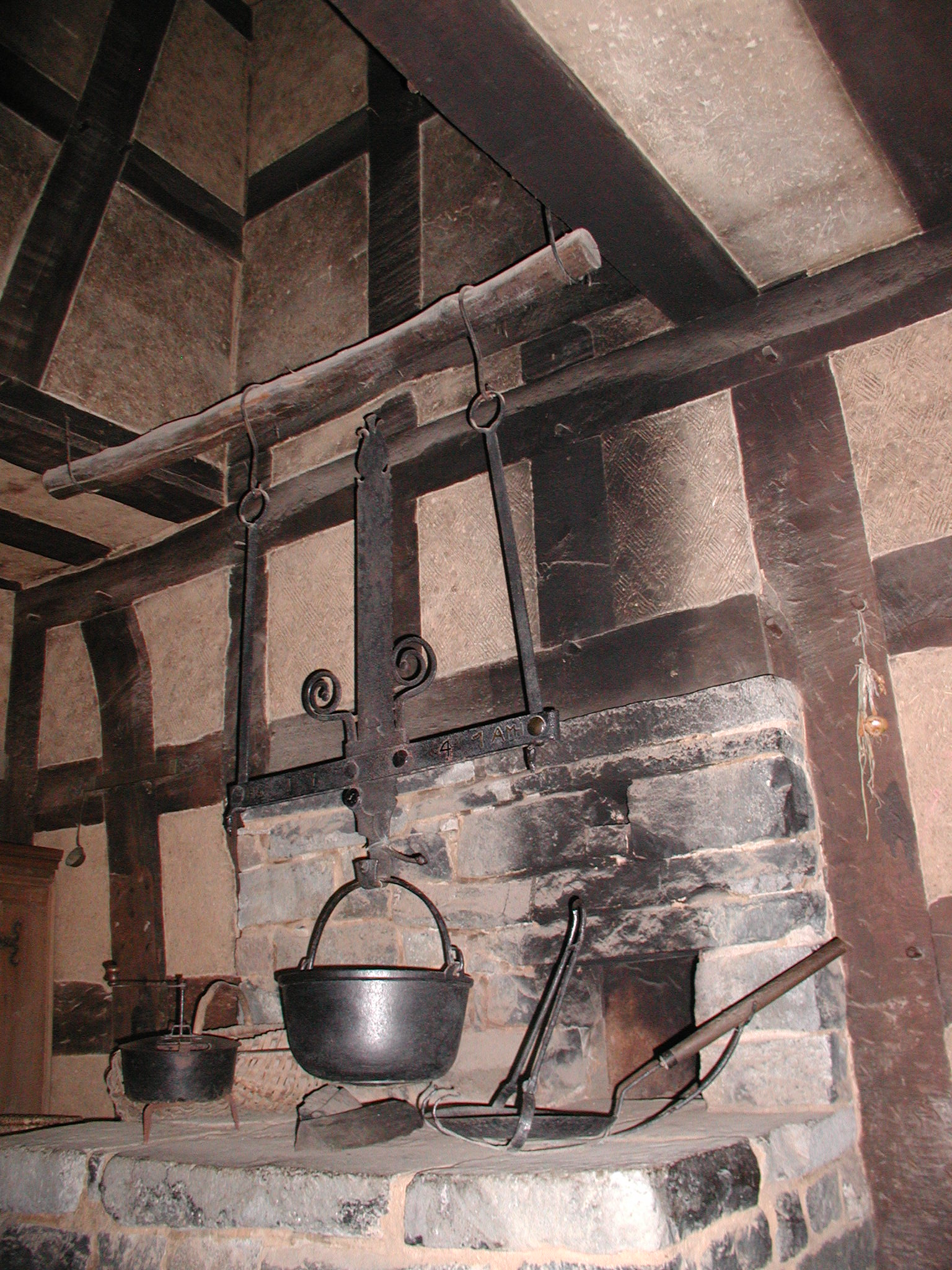
Hearth with cooking utensils

A hearth (/hɑːrθ/) is the place in a home where a fire is or was traditionally kept for home heating and for cooking, usually constituted by a horizontal hearthstone and often enclosed to varying degrees by any combination of reredos (a low, partial wall behind a hearth), fireplace, oven, smoke hood, or chimney. Hearths are usually composed of masonry such as brick or stone.

For millennia, the hearth was such an integral part of a home, usually its central and most important feature, that the concept has been generalized to refer to a homeplace or household, as in the terms "hearth and home" and "keep the home fires burning". In the modern era, since the advent of central heating, hearths are usually less central to most people's daily life because the heating of the home is instead done by a furnace or a heating stove, and cooking is instead done with a kitchen stove/range (combination cooktop and oven) alongside other home appliances; thus many homes built in the 20th and 21st centuries do not have hearths. Nonetheless, many homes still have hearths, which still help serve the purposes of warmth, cooking, and comfort.

Before the industrial era, a common design was to place a hearth in the middle of the room as an open hearth, with the smoke rising through the room to a smoke hole in the roof. In later designs, which usually had a more solid and continuous roof, the hearth was instead placed to the side of the room and provided with a chimney.

In fireplace design, the hearth is the part of the fireplace where the fire burns, usually consisting of fire brick masonry at floor level or higher, underneath the fireplace mantel.

== Archaeological features ==
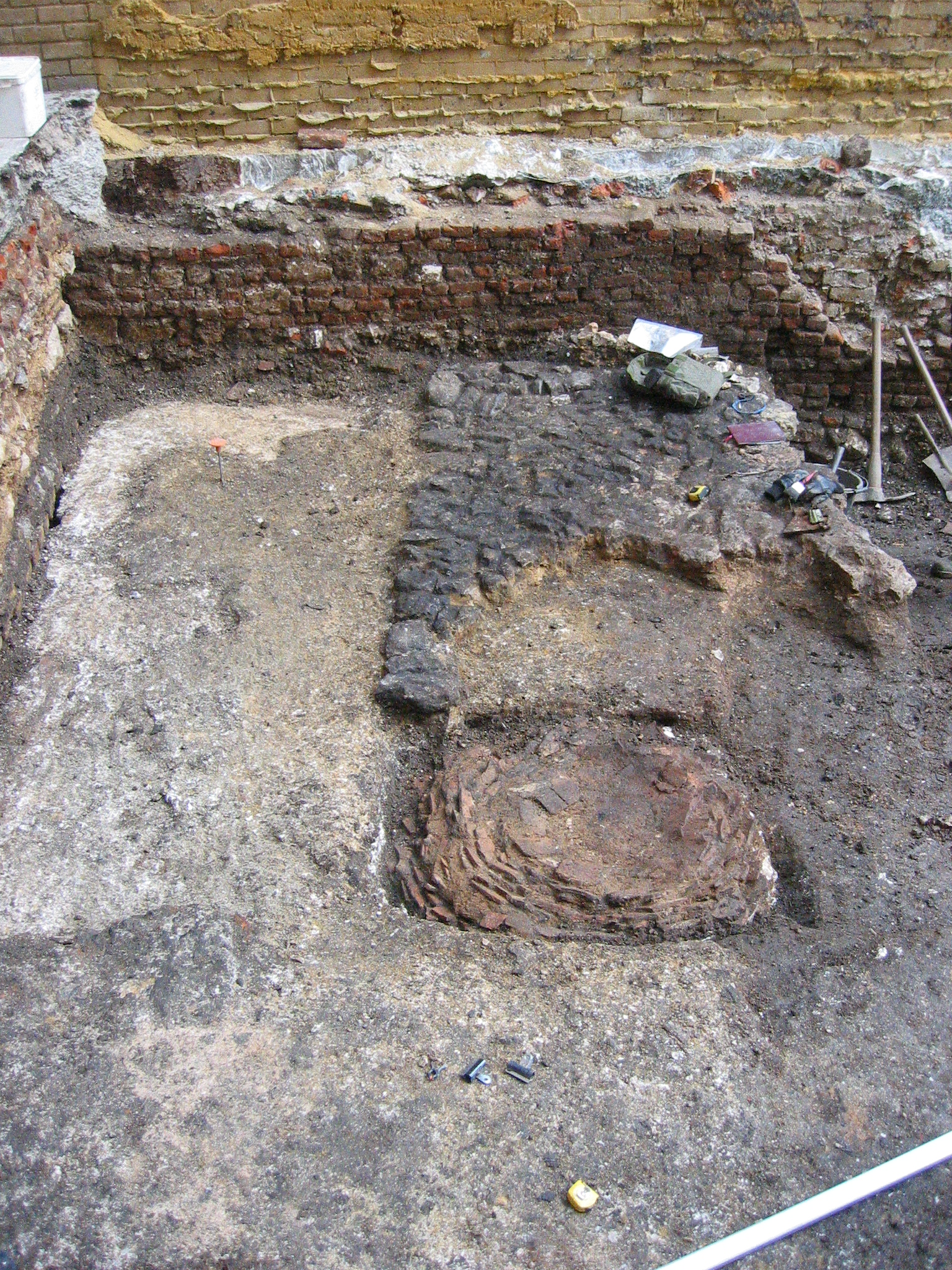
Late medieval tile hearth and associated floor

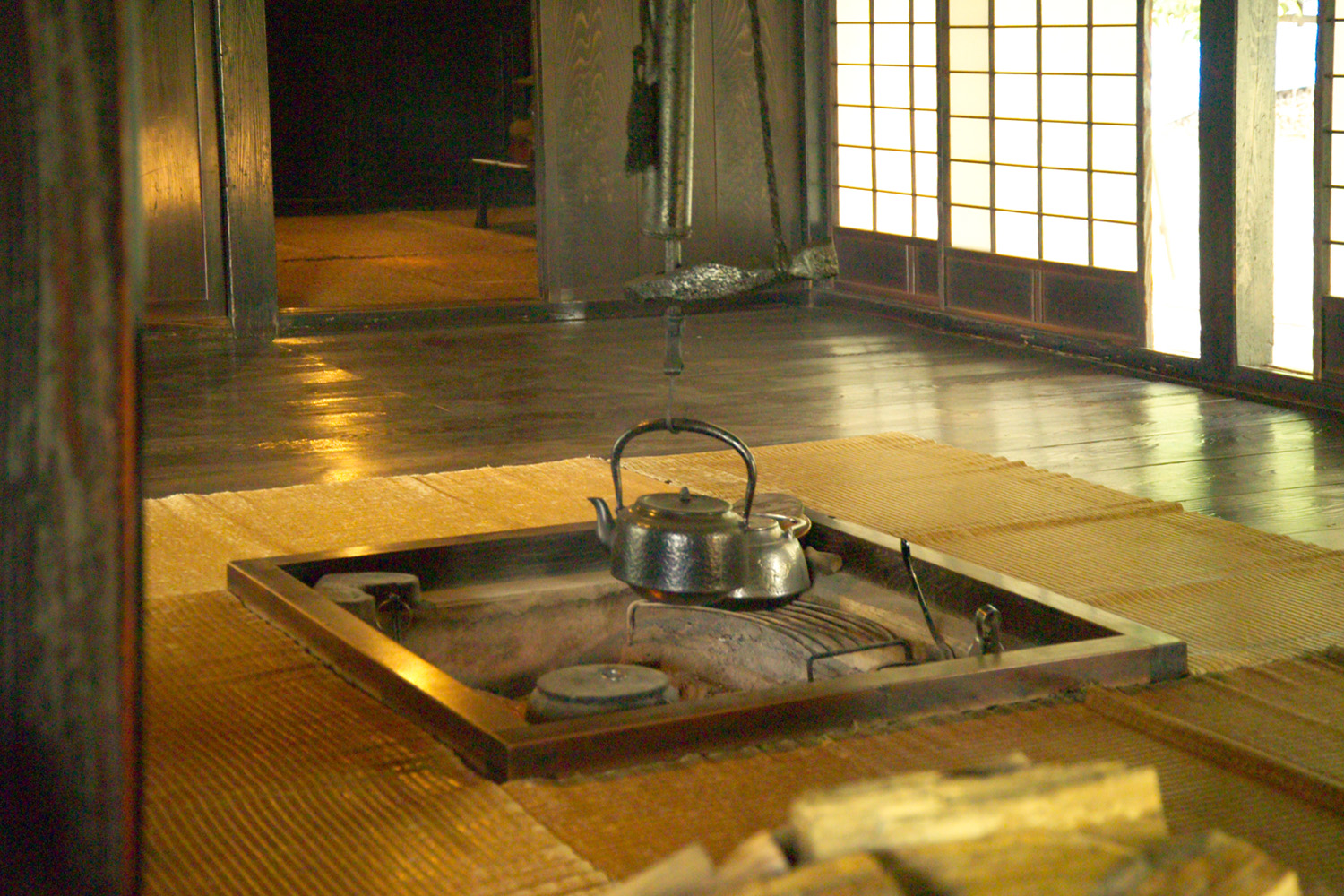
Japanese traditional hearth (irori)

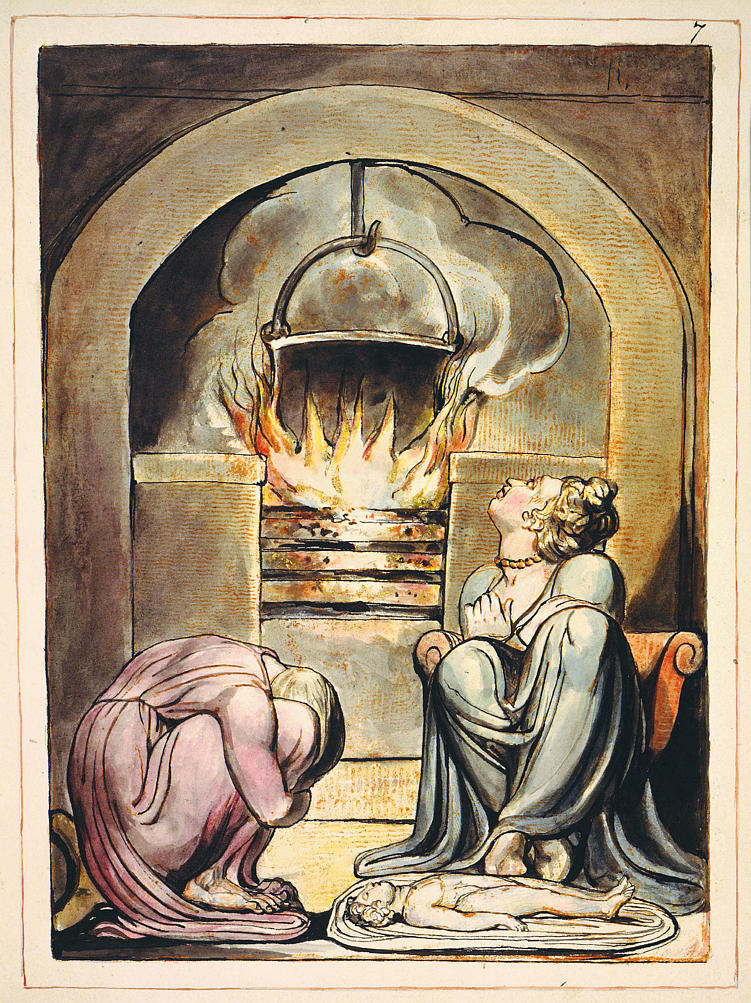
A cauldron over a fire in William Blake's illustrations to his mythical Europe a Prophecy first published in 1794. This version of the print is currently held by the Fitzwilliam Museum.

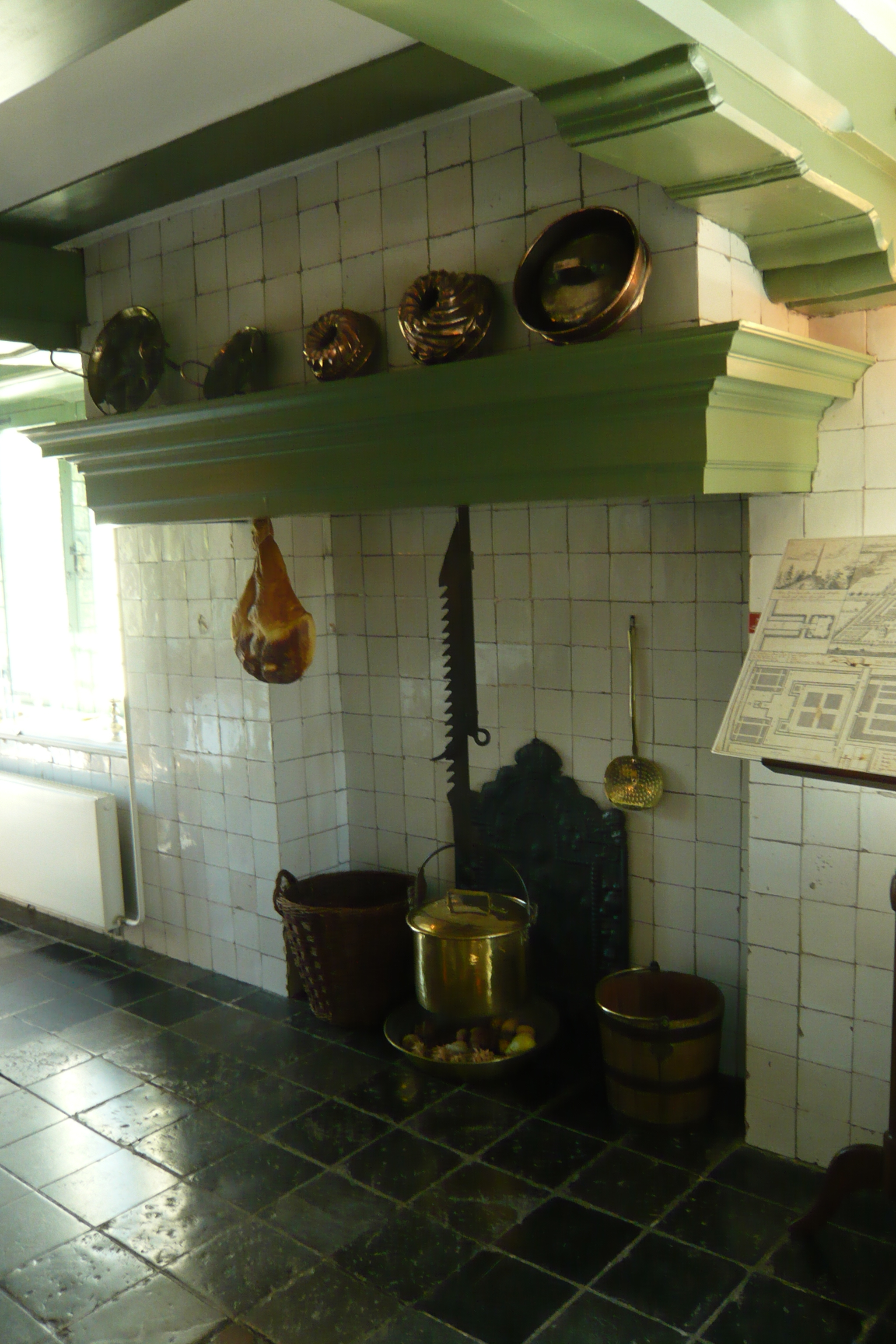
Dutch-style kitchen hearth in Hofwijck mansion, Voorburg, Netherlands

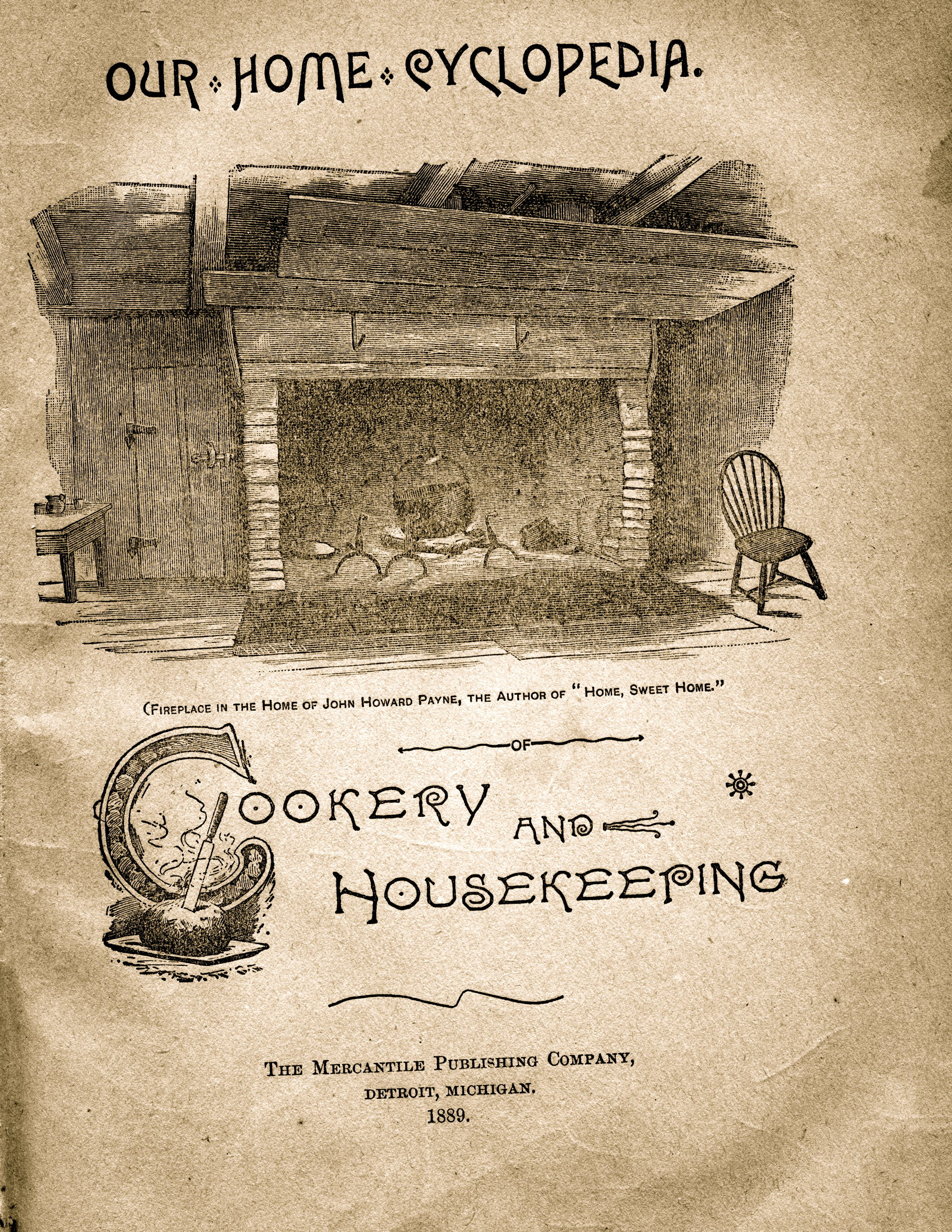
This 1889 cookbook has an illustration of the hearth in the house of John Howard Payne, who wrote the best-selling song "Home! Sweet Home!".

The word hearth derives from an Indo-European root, *ker-, referring to burning, heat, and fire (seen also in the word carbon). In archaeology, a hearth is a firepit or other fireplace feature of any period. Hearths are common features of many eras going back to prehistoric campsites and may be either lined with a wide range of materials, such as stone or left unlined. They were used for cooking, heating, and the processing of some stone, wood, faunal, and floral resources. Occasionally, site formation processes (e.g., farming or excavation—deform or disperse hearth features) make them difficult to identify without careful study.

Lined hearths are easily identified by the presence of fire-cracked rock, often created when the heat from the fires inside the hearths chemically altered and cracked the stone. Often present are fragmented fish and animal bones, carbonized shell, charcoal, ash, and other waste products, all embedded in a sequence of soil that has been deposited atop the hearth. Unlined hearths, which are less easily identified, may also include these materials. Because of the organic nature of most of these items, they can be used to pinpoint the date the hearth was last used via the process of radiocarbon dating. Although carbon dates can be negatively affected if the users of the hearth burned old wood or coal, the process is typically quite reliable. This was the most common way to cook and to heat interior spaces in cool seasons.

== Hearth tax ==
In the Byzantine Empire a tax on hearths known as kapnikon was first explicitly mentioned for the reign of Nikephorus I (802–811) although its context implies that it was already then old and established, and perhaps it should be taken back to the 7th century AD. Kapnikon was a tax raised on households without exceptions for the poor.

In England, a tax on hearths was introduced on 19 May 1662. Householders were required to pay a charge of two shillings per annum for each hearth, with half the payment due at Michaelmas and half at Lady Day. Exemptions to the tax were granted, to those in receipt of poor relief, those whose houses were worth less than 20 shillings a year and those who paid neither church nor poor rates. Also exempt were charitable institutions such as schools and almshouses, and industrial hearths with the exception of smiths' forges and bakers' ovens. The returns were lodged with the Clerk of the Peace between 1662 and 1688.

A revision of the Act in 1664 made the tax payable by all who had more than two chimneys.

The tax was abolished by William III in 1689 and the last collection was for Lady Day of that year. It was abolished in Scotland in 1690.

Hearth tax records are important to local historians as they provide an indication of the size of each assessed house at the time. The numbers of hearths are generally proportional to the size of the house. The assessments can be used to indicate the numbers and local distribution of larger and smaller houses. Not every room had a hearth, and not all houses of the same size had exactly the same number of hearths, so they are not an exact measure of house size. Roehampton University has an ongoing project which places hearth tax data in a national framework by providing a series of standard bands of wealth applicable to each county and city.

Published lists are available of many returns and the original documents are in the Public Record Office. The most informative returns, many of which have been published, occur between 1662–1666 and 1669–1674.

== Religion and folklore ==
In Greek mythology, Hestia is the goddess of the hearth, while in Roman mythology Vesta has the same role.

In ancient Persia, according to Zoroastrian traditions, every house was expected to have a hearth for offering sacrifices and prayers.

In traditional Albanian folk beliefs, the Vatër, the home hearth, is a spiritual link between past, present, and future generations of the tribe, linking ancestors to the family today and to descendants tomorrow.

In Shinto, the god of the hearth is Kōjin. Among the Ainu of Hokkaido, the goddess of the hearth is Kamuy-huci.

Hearth is also a term for a family unit, or local worship group, in the Heathen religion.

== See also ==
- Agungi
- Brazier
- Buttumak
- Cook stove
- Firebox (architecture)
- Fireplace
- Fire making
- Firepit
- Forge
- Hall house
- Hibachi
- Inglenook
- Irori
- Kitchen
- Vesta – Goddess of the hearth
