= Agungi =

Traditional Korean firebox for cooking

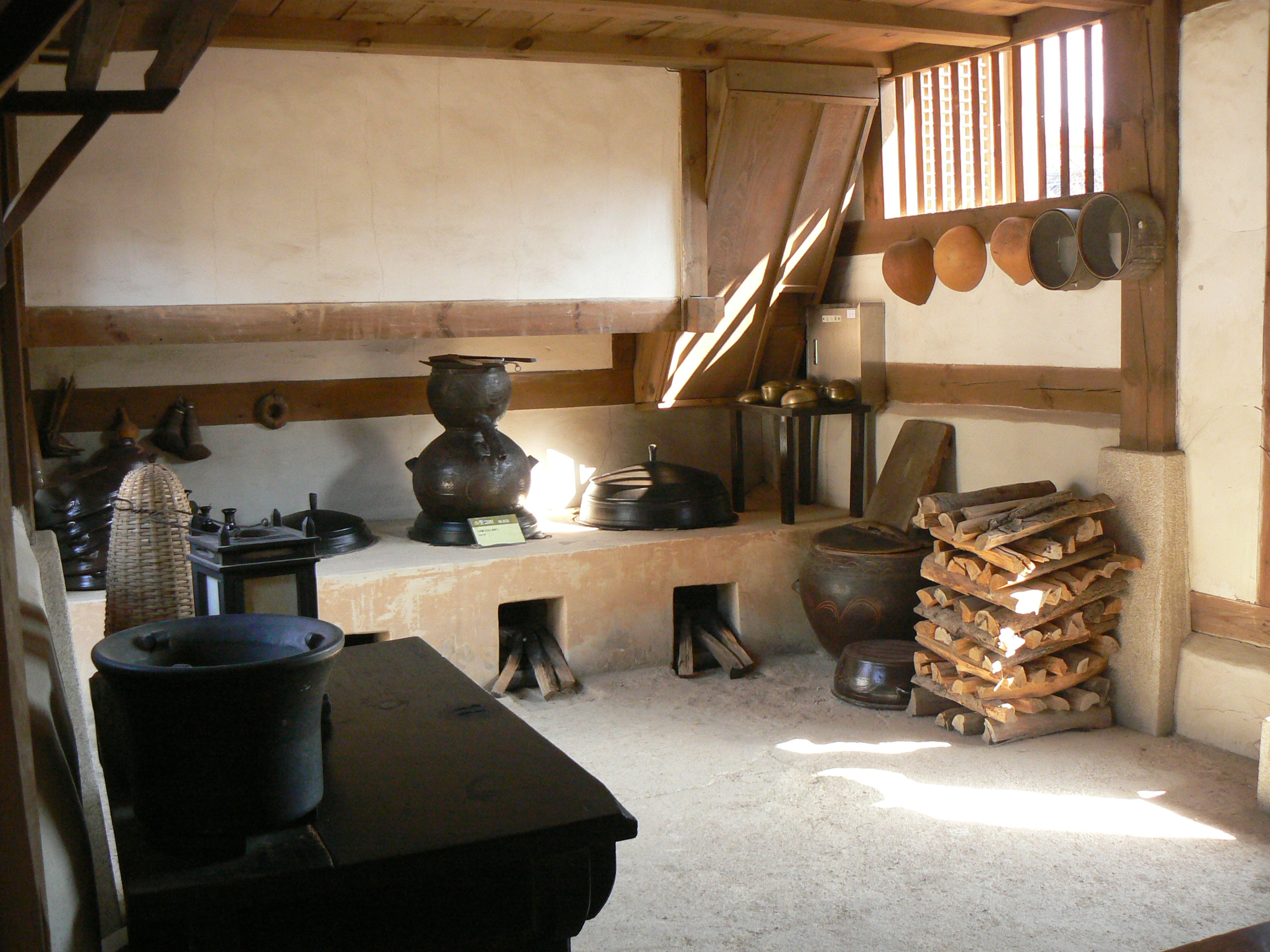
- A traditional Korean kitchen with agungi (firebox) and buttumak (hearth)

Korean name
- Hangul: 아궁이
- RR: agungi
- MR: agungi
- IPA: [a.ɡuŋ.i]

Buttumak
- Hangul: 부뚜막
- RR: buttumak
- MR: puttumak
- IPA: [pu.t͈u.mak̚]

An agungi (Korean: 아궁이) is a firebox found in traditional Korean kitchens which is used to burn firewood or other fuel for cooking. It is also a part of the traditional floor heating system, or ondol. The flat cooktop counter or hearth installed over the agungi is called a buttumak (부뚜막).

== History ==
Early buttumak have been dated to the 10th‒4th century BCE. Iron and ceramic buttumaks, similar to their later forms, were excavated from Goguryeo 1st century BCE historical sites, such as Anak Tomb No. 3.

Many Korean agrarian kitchens had buttumak with charcoal-fueled agungi until the early 1970s.

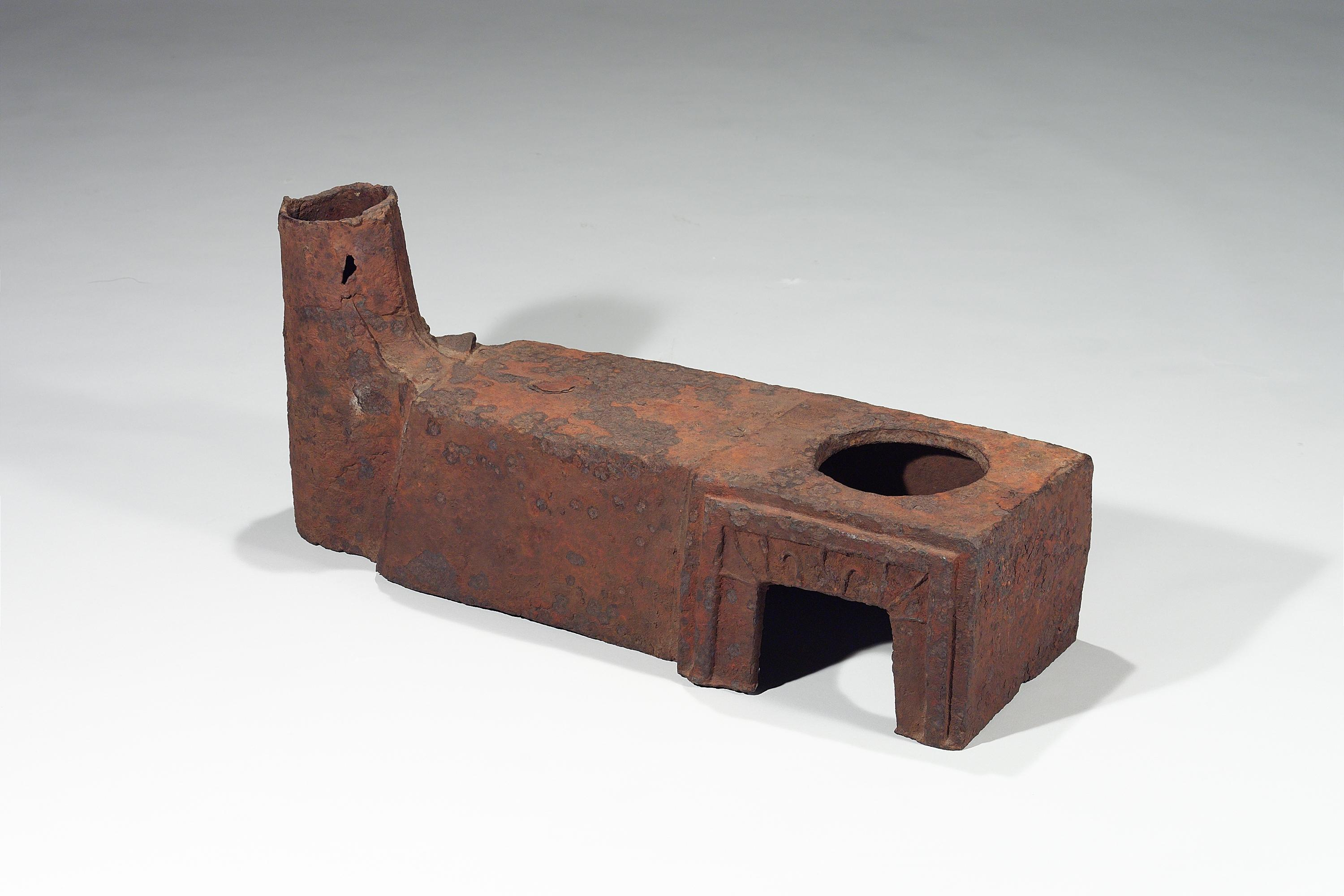
Iron buttumak from Goguryeo (37 BCE ‒ 668 CE)

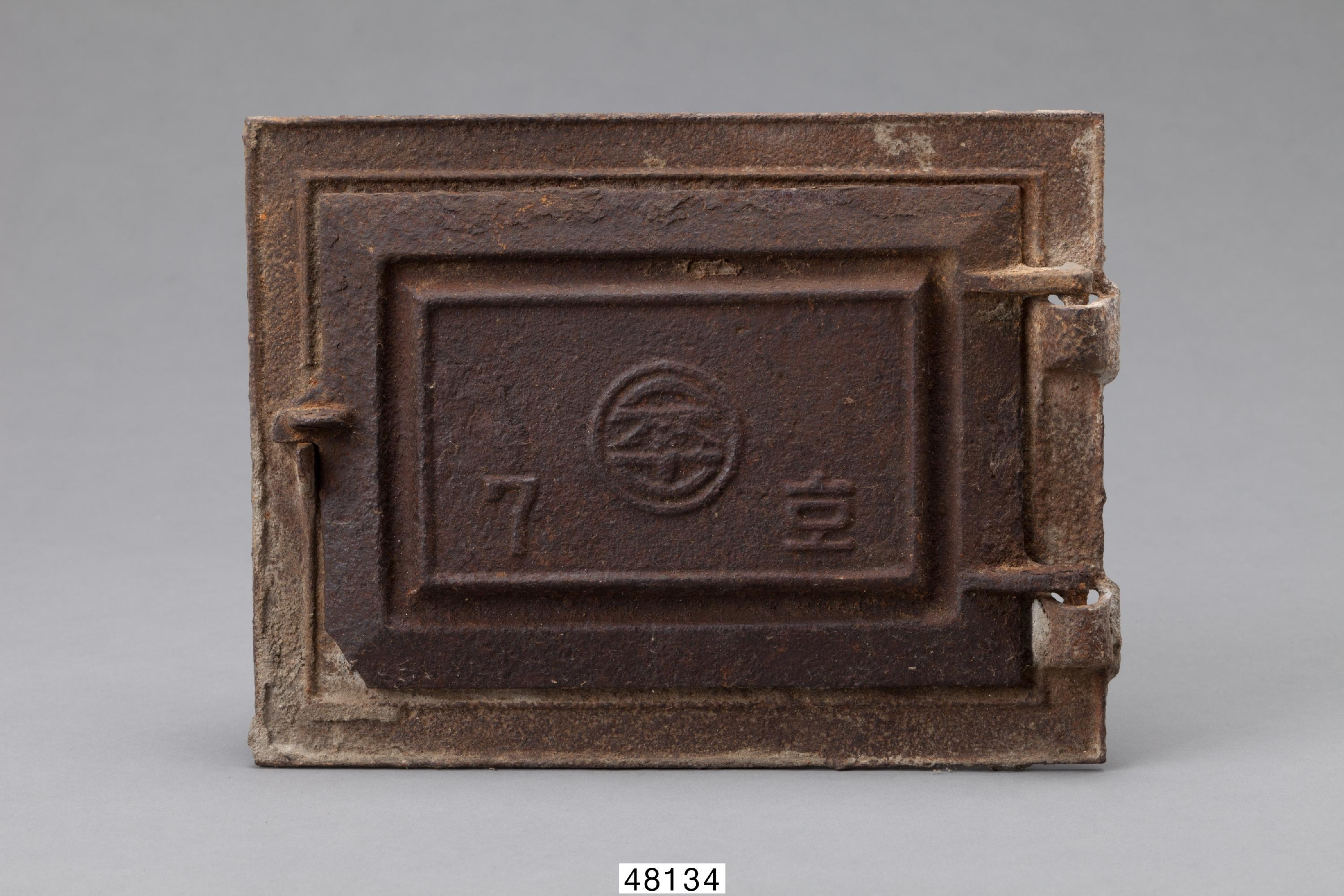
Agungi door from agrarian South Korea in the mid-20th century

== Structure ==
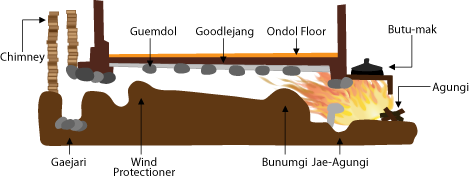
The structure of traditional Korean fireplace illustrated in a diagram of hanok's kitchen and an adjoining ondol room

Buttumaks in agrarian Korean kitchens were commonly made from brick or stone and then smoothed with clay.

Above each agungi is an upward opening where gamasot (big pot or cauldron used on agungi) can be set onto the buttumak. A kitchen may have buttumak with multiple agungi holes and upward openings, or a single agungi hole and a single upward opening. Each agungi can be covered with an iron plate or door to control the fire.

Agungi and buttumak are among the main components of the traditional ondol (floor heating) system. Vents in the back of agungi are opened on cold days to allow the smoke and hot air flow through the flues underneath ondol rooms and exit into the chimney at the other end of the house.

== Influences ==
Japanese kamado was their adaptation of buttumak introduced from Korea. The word kamado (竈) also has its root in Korean word gama (가마), a synonym of buttumak. The word gama in modern Korean is usually used to refer to kilns, but the usage of the word meaning buttumak can be found in some compounds such as gamasot (literally gama cauldron) referring to the cauldron used on buttumak.

== See also ==
- Cook stove
- Furnace
- Hearth
- Hibachi
- Hob
- Kang bed-stove
- Kiln
- Masonry heater
- Russian stove
