= Firebox (architecture) =

Fireplace part where fuel is burned

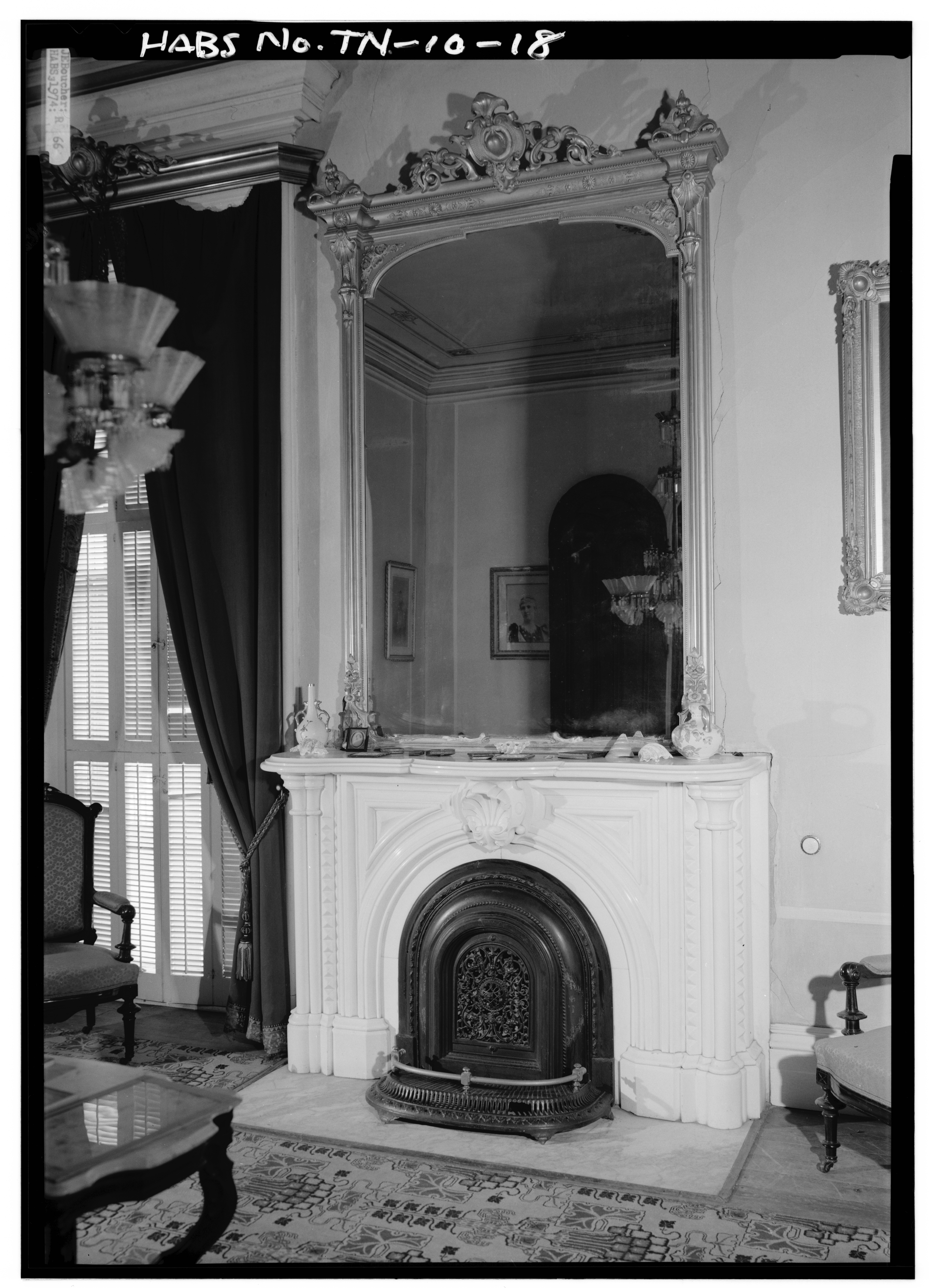
Fireplace in the Colonel McNeal House showing coal grated firebox and mirror above

A firebox or firepit is the part of the fireplace where fuel is combusted, in distinction from the hearth, chimney, mantel, overdoor and flue elements of the total fireplace system. The firebox normally sits on a masonry base at the floor level of the room. Some fireboxes are large in proportion so that a person could actually walk inside, or in extreme cases, have a small meeting using built-in benches inside. An example of the latter oversized construction can be found in the great hall of Muchalls Castle in Scotland.

== See also ==
- Andiron
- Agungi
