= Zapekanka (drink) =

Zapekanka (Russian: запека́нка) is a historical alcoholic drink based on vodka and fruits common in Ukraine and Southern Russia. For a homemade preparation, fresh fruits or berries with sugar and possibly species added were placed in a pot, which was topped with vodka and tightly closed, even plastered with dough. The pot was placed into a Russian stove for a long time after the firewood was fully burned. It was also prepared on a commercial scale by some distilleries.
