= Kang (heated platform) =

Traditional Chinese heated masonry platform

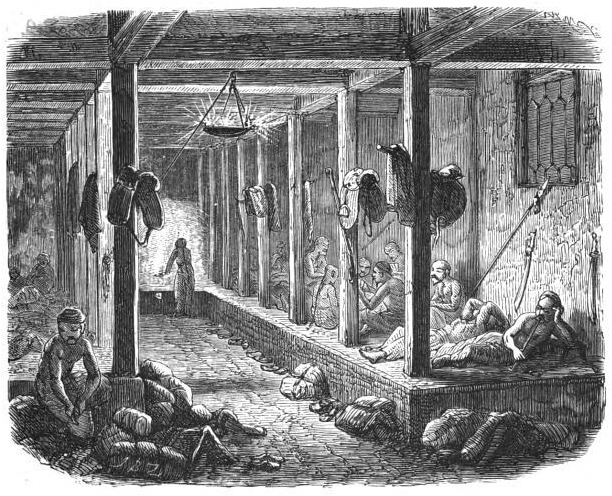
A large kang shared by the guests of a one-room inn in a then-wild area east of Tonghua, Jilin, as seen by Henry E.M. James in 1887

The kang (Chinese: 炕; pinyin: kàng; Manchu: ᠨᠠᡥᠠᠨ nahan, Kazakh: кән) is a traditional heated platform, 2 metres or more long, used for general living, working, entertaining and sleeping in the northern part of China, where the winter climate is cold. It is made of bricks or other forms of fired clay and more recently of concrete in some locations. The word kang means "to dry".

Its interior cavity, leading to an often-convoluted flue system, channels the hot exhaust from a firewood/coal fireplace, usually the cooking fire from an adjacent room that serves as a kitchen, sometimes from a stove set below floor level. This allows a longer contact time between the exhaust (which still contains much heat from the combustion source) and (indirectly) the inside of the room, hence more heat transfer/recycling back into the room, effectively making it a ducted heating system similar to the Roman hypocaust. A separate stove may be used to control the amount of smoke circulating through the kang, maintaining comfort in warmer weather. Typically, a kang occupies one-third to one half of the floor space, and is used for sleeping at night and for other activities during the day. A kang which covers the entire floor is called a dikang (Chinese: 地炕; pinyin: dì kàng; lit. 'ground kang').

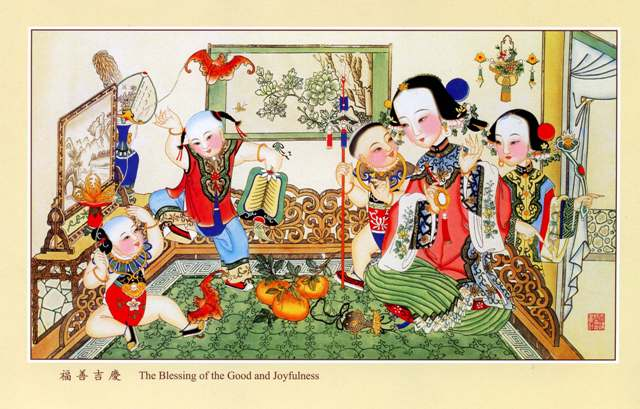
The blessing of the good and the joyfulness. The lady of the house is accompanied by a maid. The children are playing around the mother on the kang. The artist Gao Yinzhang lived 1835–1906.

Like the European masonry stove, a massive block of masonry is used to retain heat. While it might take several hours of heating to reach the desired surface temperature, a properly designed bed raised to sufficient temperature should remain warm throughout the night without the need to maintain a fire.

== History ==
Sites in Shenyang, Liaoning, show humans using the heated bed floor as early as 7,200 years ago. The bed at this excavation is made of 10 cm pounded clay on the floor. The bed was heated by zhidi, which involves placing an open fire on the bed floor and clearing the ashes before sleeping. In the excavated example the repeated burning is believed to have turned the bed surface hard and moisture resistant.

The first known heated platform appeared in what is now Northeastern China and used a single-flue system like the Roman hypocaust and the Korean ondol. An example was unearthed among 1st-century building remains in Heilongjiang Province. Its flue is L-shaped, built from adobe and cobblestones and covered with stone slabs.

Heated walls huoqiang (Chinese: 火牆; pinyin: Huǒqiáng) with a double-flue system were found in a 4th-century palace building in Jilin Province. It had an L-shaped adobe bench with a double-flue system. The structure is more complex than a single-flue system and has functionality similar to a kang.

Literary evidence from Li Daoyuan's Commentary on the Water Classic also gives evidence of heated floors during the Northern Wei Dynasty (386–534 AD), though this was not explicitly named a dikang:

In Guanji Temple [near the present-day Fengrun in Hebei province], there is a grand lecture hall. It is very high and wide to accommodate a thousand monks. The platform of the hall was constructed with stones arranged as a network of channels, and the floor was finished with a coat of clay. Fires are set at outdoor openings at the four sides of the platform, while the heat flows inwards, warming the entire hall. The construction was established by a benefactor (or benefactors) to enable the monks to study in cold winters.

The kang may have evolved to its bed design due to ongoing cultural changes during the Northern and Southern Dynasties, as high furniture and chairs came to be prevalent over the earlier style of floor-sitting and low-lying furniture in Chinese culture. The earliest kang remains have been discovered at Ninghai, Heilongjiang Province, in the Longquanfu Palace (699–926) of Balhae origin.

== Culture ==
Author Harry A. Franck, sitting on the kang in his room in a Chinese inn

Traditional Chinese Dwellings Zhongguo chuantong minju (Chinese: 中國傳統民居; pinyin: Zhōngguó chuántǒng mínjū) (a bilingual text) has a few line drawings of kangs. It says that the kang is used to cook meals and heat the room, making full use of the heat-retaining capacity of the loess (soil used to make adobe). The kang produces radiant heat to indirectly warm the interior space as well as the bed mass itself. It has been speculated that one of the oldest forms of Chinese housing, heated cave dwellings known as yaodong (Chinese: 窰洞; pinyin: Yáodòng), widespread throughout northern China would have been uninhabitable without the kang.

The kang was also an important feature of traditional dwellings in often-frigid Manchuria, where it was known as nahan in Manchu. It plays an important role in Manchurian mourning customs. The deceased is placed beside the kang instead of in the central hall, as is Han Chinese practice. The height of the board on which the body is placed indicates the family status or age of the deceased.

== See also ==
- Hypocaust
- Kotatsu
- Masonry heater
- Ondol – similar system in Korea
- Russian stove
- Underfloor heating
