= Masonry heater =

Heating device

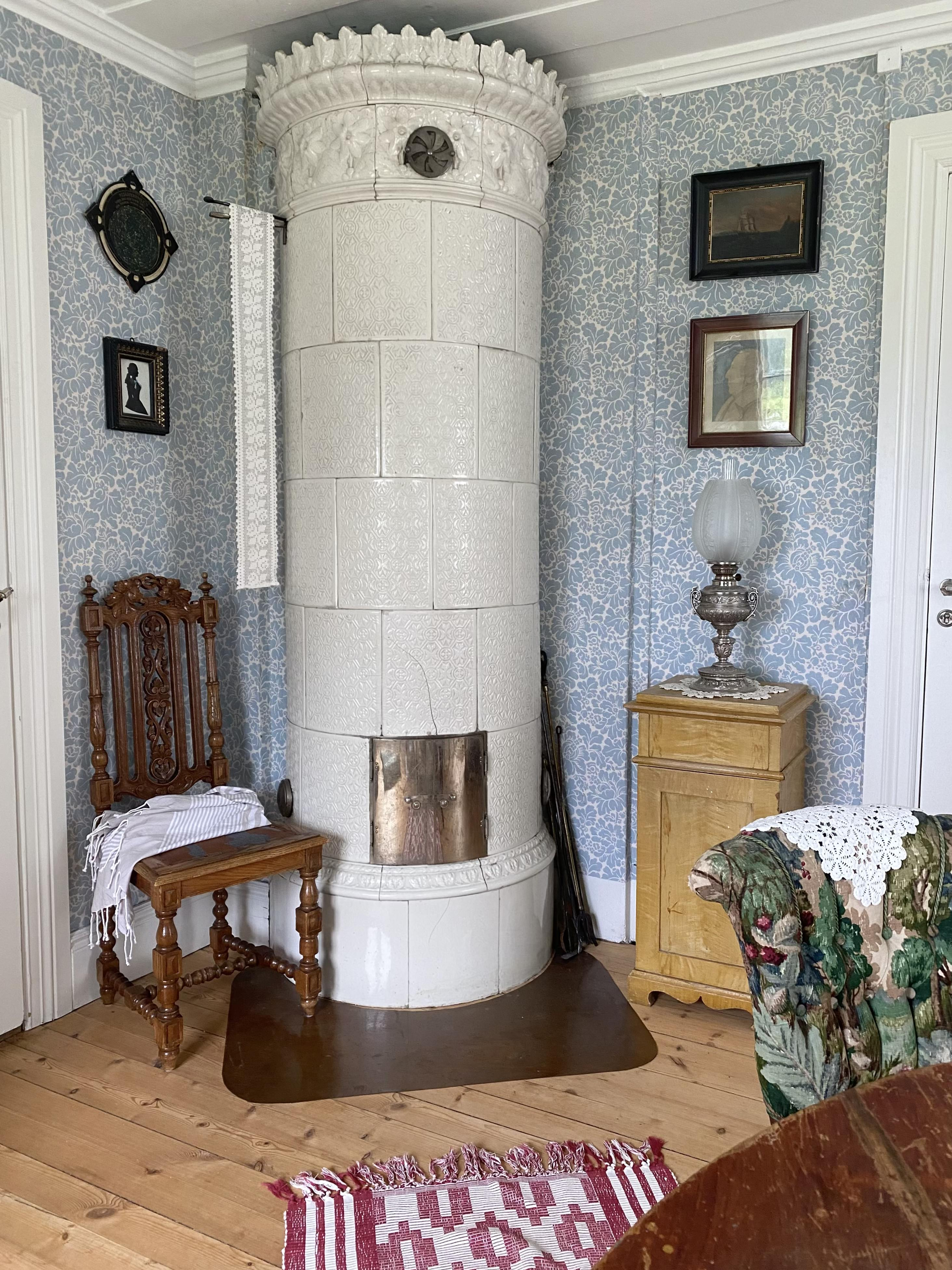
A classic Scandinavian style round ceramic stove, which fits in the corner of a room, from the porcelaine manufacturer Rörstrand in Stockholm, c. 1900

A masonry heater (also called a masonry stove or cocklestove) is a device for warming an interior space through radiant heating, by capturing the heat from periodic burning of fuel (usually wood), and then radiating the heat at a fairly constant temperature for a long period. Masonry heaters covered in tile are called Kachelofen (also tile stoves or ceramic stoves). The technology has existed in different forms, from the Neoglacial and Neolithic periods. Archaeological digs have revealed that ancient inhabitants utilized hot smoke from fires in their subterranean dwellings to radiate heat into the living spaces. These early forms eventually evolved into modern systems.

Evidence found from 5,000 BC of massive blocks of masonry used to retain heat foreshadowed early forms of fire hearths that were used as multifunctional heating sources. Later evolutions came in the Roman hypocaust, Chinese kang, Korean ondol and Spanish gloria; and Austro-German cocklestove (kachelofen, literally 'tile oven', or steinofen, 'stone oven'), using the smoke and exhaust of a single fire. In Eastern and Northern Europe and North Asia, these stoves evolved in many different forms and names: for example the Russian stove (Russian: Русская печь), the Finnish stove (in Finnish: pystyuuni or kaakeliuuni, 'tile oven', or pönttöuuni, 'drum oven' for the metal-clad version) and the Swedish stove (in Swedish: kakelugn, 'tile stove') associated with Carl Johan Cronstedt and Fabian Casimir Wrede.

A masonry heater is defined by ASTM International as a "vented heating system of predominantly masonry construction having a mass of at least 800 kg (1,760 lb), excluding the chimney and masonry heater base. In particular, a masonry heater is designed specifically to capture and store a substantial portion of the heat from a solid fuel fire in the mass of the masonry heater through internal heat-exchange flue channels, to enable a charge of solid fuel (mixed with an adequate amount of air) to burn rapidly and more completely at high temperatures, in order to reduce emission of unburned hydrocarbons, and be constructed of sufficient mass and surface area such that under normal operating conditions, the external surface temperature of the masonry heater (except in the region immediately surrounding the fuel loading door(s)) does not exceed 110 °C (230 °F)."

== Characteristics ==
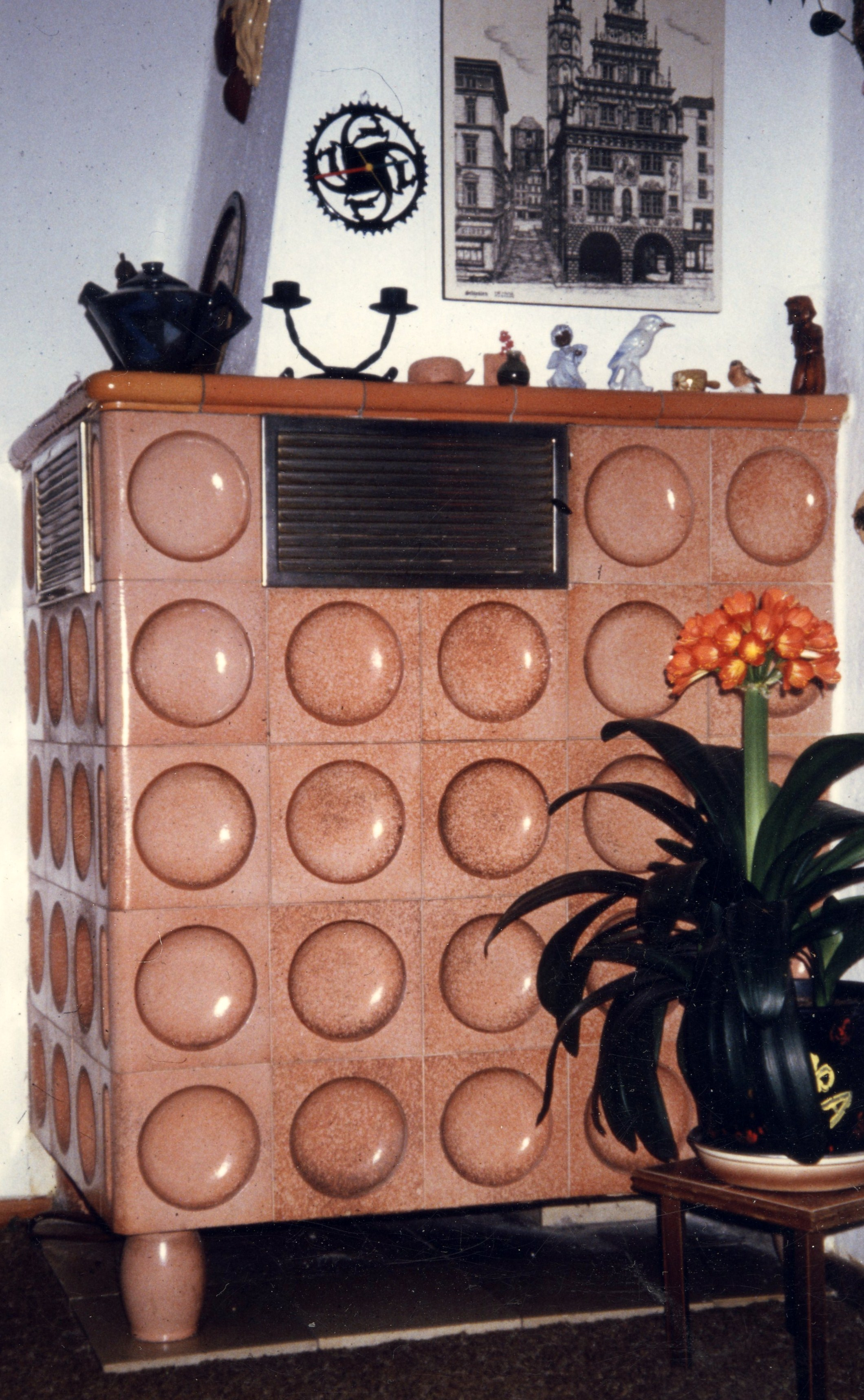
A cocklestove used for central heating, built around 1959

A masonry heater is made of masonry such as brick (firebrick), soapstone, tile, stone, stucco, or a combination of materials, rather than steel or cast iron. It usually requires special support to bear its weight. It consists of a firebox and heat-exchange channels or partitions that provide additional surface area. These absorb heat from the hot exhaust gases before the gases exit into the chimney. When not being fired, the connection from the masonry heater to the chimney sometimes has a damper to prevent heat from escaping up the chimney; the heat is then radiated from the masonry.

Masonry takes longer to heat than metal; however, once warm, the heater will radiate this heat over a much longer period of time and at a much lower temperature than a metal stove would use (the metal is hot only when there is a fire burning inside the stove and for a short time thereafter). Seating and even beds can be built adjoining the masonry stove; this is possible because the heater's exterior surfaces are cool enough to touch safely. The characteristic of slow heat-release can make a masonry heater a more convenient option for heating a house than a metal wood stove.

Heat stress is a major concern during the construction of masonry heaters. Differences in temperature inside the masonry core of the heater can result in differential expansion. A skilled heater mason knows how to provide for this stress when designing and constructing the heater, thereby preventing uneven expansion from causing cracking in the exterior. There are two general ways this concern is addressed. One is to incorporate a gap between the inner core of the heater and its outer "skin". The other is to build a more monolithic design with post-tension aspects to mechanically compensate for expansion and contraction.

The speed with which a stove, masonry or otherwise, achieves the right temperature is determined by the specific thickness and characteristics of the materials used in its construction. Very responsive metal heaters warm up faster and are good for quicker adjustments to indoor temperature. Less responsive heaters take longer to warm, but they are better suited for long periods of cold weather because they store and provide heat over a longer period.

== Kachelofen ==
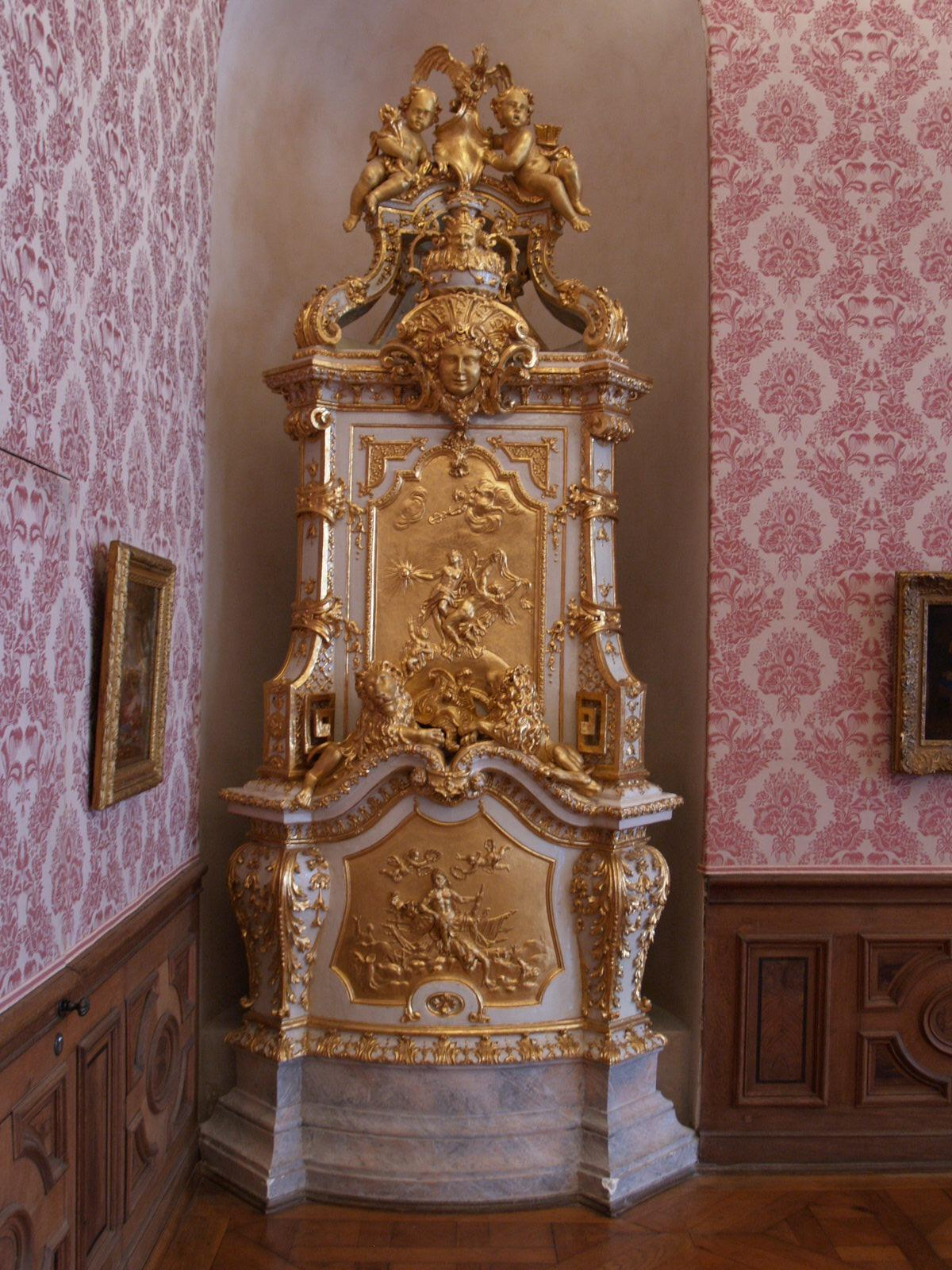
Kachelofen by Joseph Effner, Schleissheim Palace (c. 1720)

The German Kachelofen (tiled stove) is a relatively large home heater surrounded with ceramic tiles, which has existed for at least five centuries. During the Renaissance period in Germany, the builders of such stoves were part of a distinct trade and were called Hafnermeister.

A Kachelofen uses a maze-like passage created out of firebrick to release gases and smoke from the wood fire slowly, allowing the firebrick to retain as much heat as possible from the gases and smoke. The ceramic tile surrounding the stove also acts as thermal mass to retain heat. Such stoves were carefully designed so that the minimum amount of heat would escape, only as much as needed to warm the flue to maintain a proper air draught. The firebrick used in the construction holds 80% more heat than ferrous metals such as cast iron, while its heat conductivity is 1/45 that of iron or steel. A Kachelofen is efficient enough to warm a well-insulated house for up to 6 to 12 hours after the fire has stopped burning.

== Russian stove ==
The Russian stove, another typical masonry heater, evolved in Russia in 15th century, after the brick flue was added to the traditional black-fired fireplace, which lacked the smokestack and vented directly into the room. The addition of the flue allowed for the better heat use by passing the smoke and gases through the brick labyrinth called kolenya (коленья, 'knees' or 'bends') before allowing it into the smokestack. The large thermal mass of these bends captured the heat, slowly releasing it afterwards. The typical Russian stove is a large, generally cuboid mass of masonry, usually weighing around 1–2 tons, built in the center of a traditional izba log hut, covered in stucco and carefully whitewashed.

Most Russian stoves consist of a massive firebrick hearth, often large enough for a grown man to fit into, with a flue continuing into a maze-like heat exchanger built of a normal brick, usually with a built-in stove for cooking, which sometimes used a secondary fireplace to quickly cook foods without heating the whole affair; all covered with an outer brick shell, normally with a pedestal for a kitchen work and beds built into it. The stove was usually constructed by one of the house's walls, or, in the larger, multi-room houses, was placed in one of the walls, in which case the room without the fireplace, and thus the smoke, but heated by the brick side of the stove, was called svetlitsa ('light one') and used as a living room, while the other was used as a kitchen. The small spaces left behind the stove and under its log foundation were called zapechye ('behind the stove') and podpechye ('under the stove'), and used as dry, warm storage.

== Finnish stove ==
Video of a masonry heater in Finland

Traditional Finnish stoves closely follow the round Swedish tile heater in appearance, typically constructed from brick. In the late 19th century the idea of using sheet metal rings, instead of tile, caught on in Finland. The first mention of using metal to cover the heater can be found in a Swedish patent application dating to 1878. The metal-clad heater did not catch on in Sweden, but became the most popular masonry heater type in Finland. The metal was typically left bare and was constructed from galvanized sheet metal, it could also be painted. The metal clad masonry heater is known as a pönttöuuni in Finnish and plåtugn in Swedish-speaking regions.

Clay mortar instead of cement was used in the construction, the chimney exit was often placed at the base of the heater so that the heater could be free standing due to movement from thermal expansion and contraction.

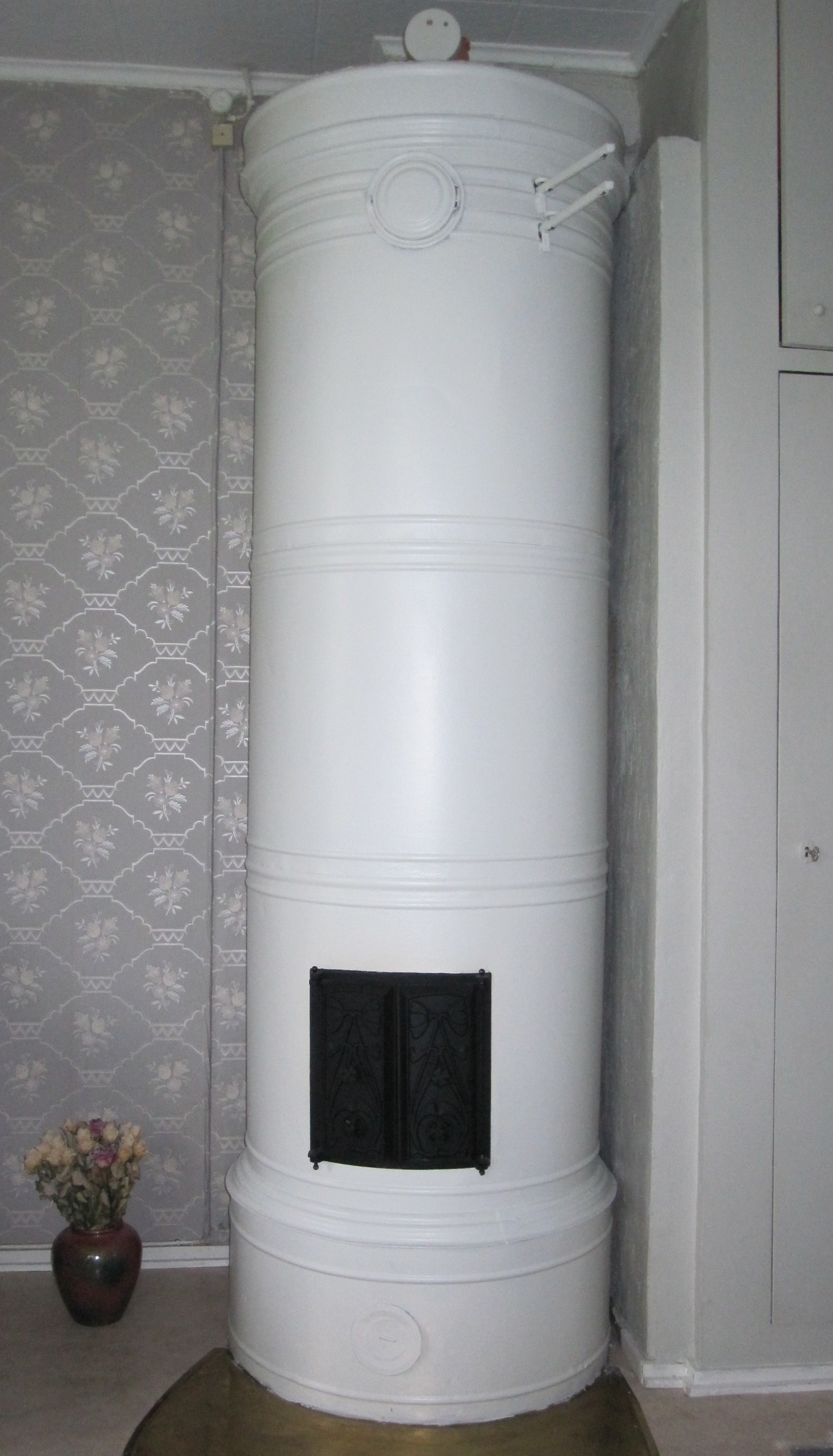
A white painted pönttöuuni

Advantages of covering the heater in sheet metal include the near-elimination of smoke leaks into the room, in turn allowing the heater to be fired more often and to hotter temperatures than its tiled counterpart, which could develop cracks and leak smoke if treated in a similar way. The metal surface was also easy to keep clean. The rings are reusable and once the masonry heater was worn out it could be torn down and rebuilt with new bricks.

The pönttöuuni is still in production in Finland. Modern developments include glass doors, and the secondary combustion of flue gasses via the introduction of fresh air above the flames help meet modern standards. The heater might be built from different materials other than the traditional brick. Brick is still used but in modern heaters the firebox itself is made from high temperature firebrick, the rest of the heater is made from cheaper bricks. In traditional heaters the inside of the firebox was often covered with clay mortar for protection.

== Fuel sources ==
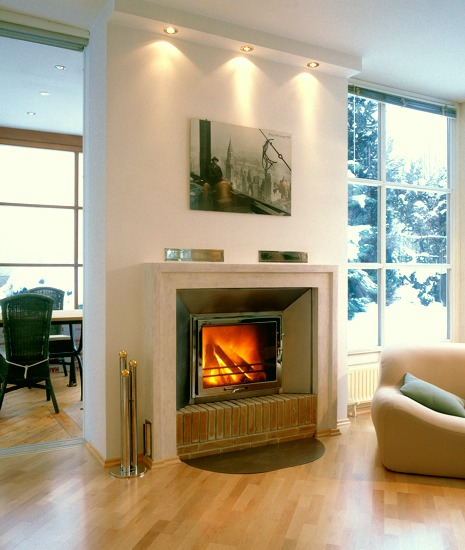
Modern masonry heater

Since masonry heaters burn hot and fast, they can accept any dry, split wood, usually three to five inches (8 to 13 cm) in diameter. These heaters are sometimes effectively fired using grass, straw, and hay. It is common in Eastern Europe to modify these heaters so that they are connected to the gas network and are fuelled with gas. Some modern models incorporate electric heating elements connected to a thermostat. The electric heating is required to prevent the building from freezing damage should it be left unattended for long periods during the winter.

== Modern development ==
Some contemporary masonry heaters do not have a ceramic-tile exterior. Instead, the refractory bricks are covered by a heat-resistant kind of plaster. A glass door allows the burning fire to be seen. As in the past, once the firewood has burned, the warmed mass of the stove continues to radiate heat, but the sizes of the flue passages of modern masonry heaters are more exactly calculated to provide increased efficiency and output and to use less wood.

Some modern masonry heaters are made out of soapstone, which has particularly high heat retention. In Finland, olivine rock is used as well.

== Gallery ==
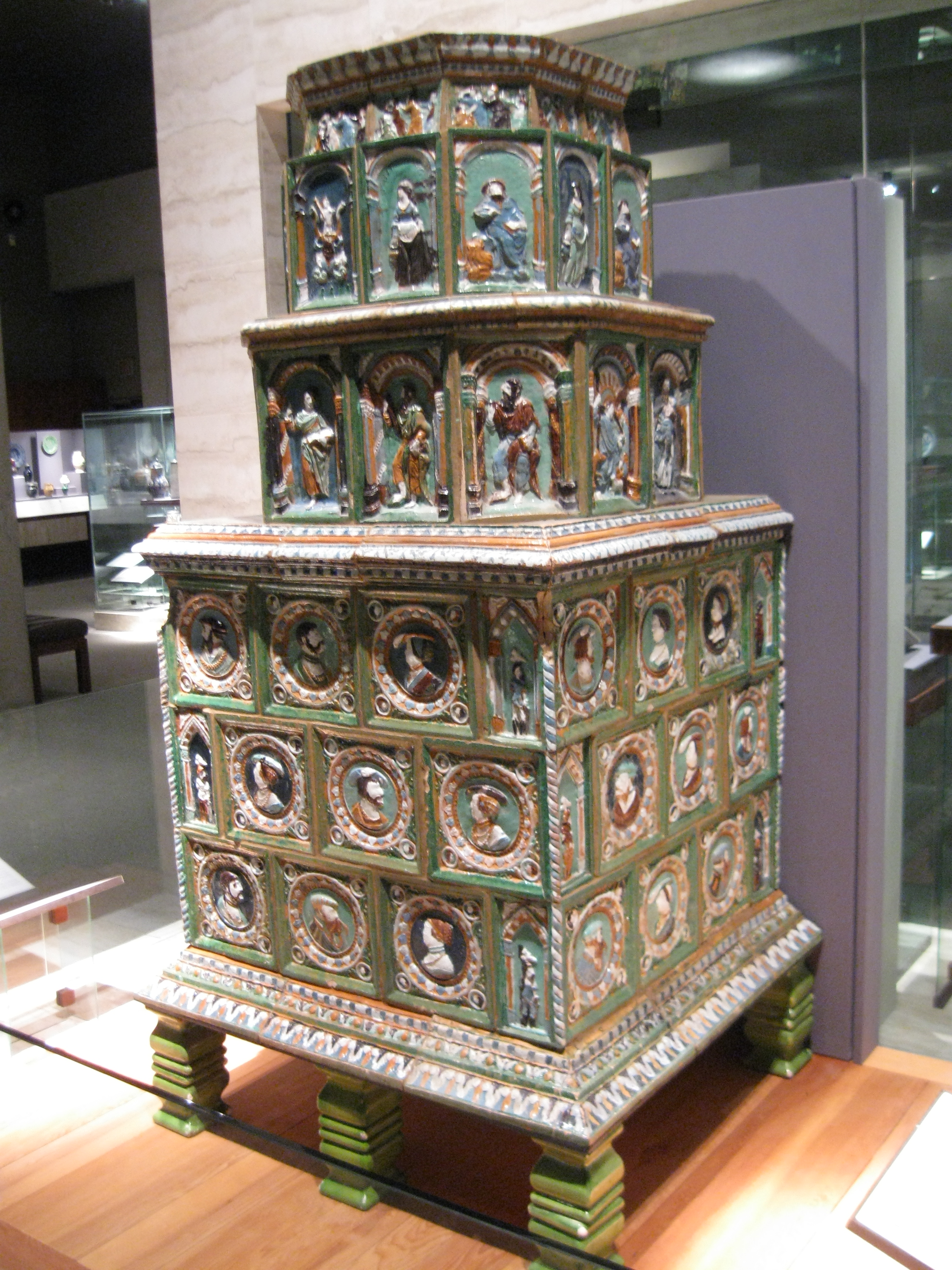

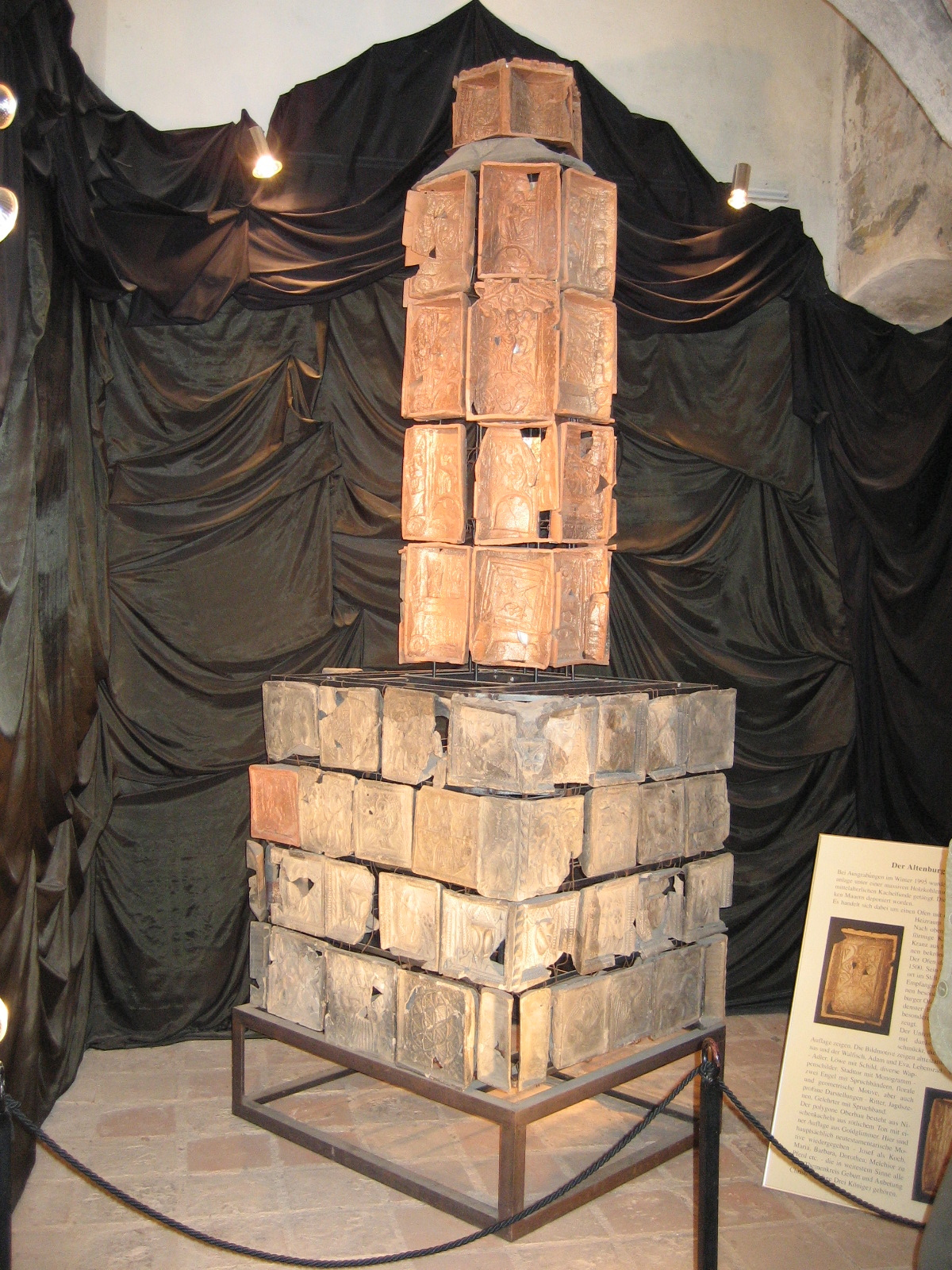

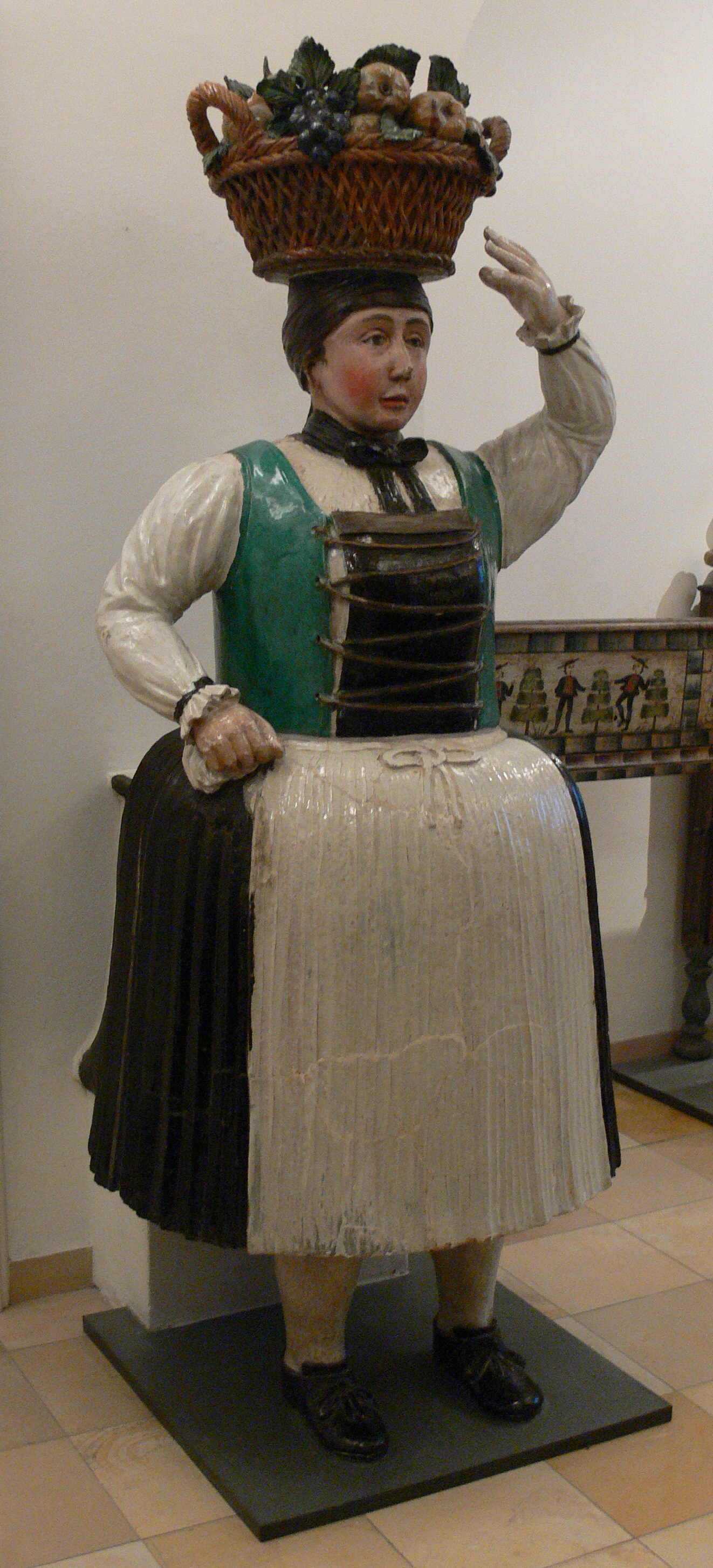

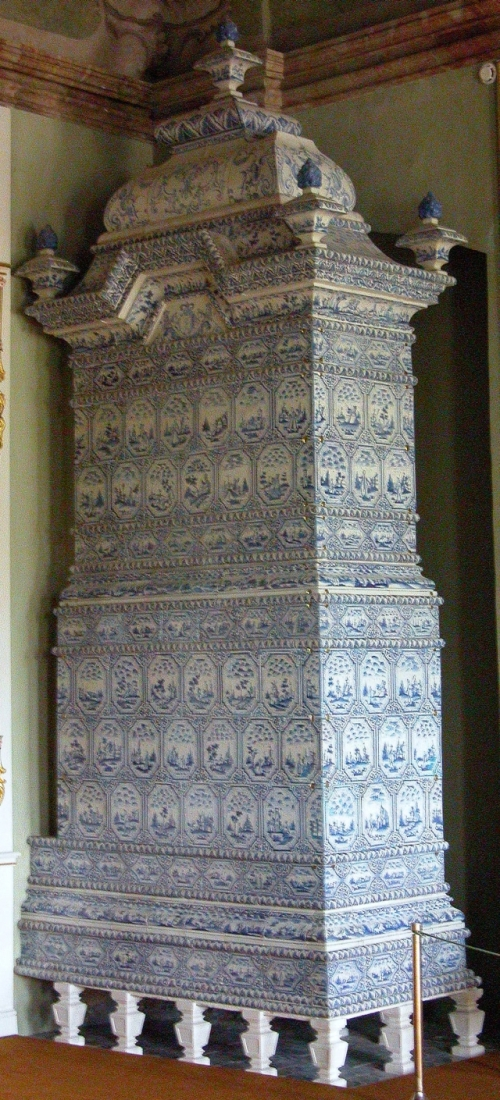

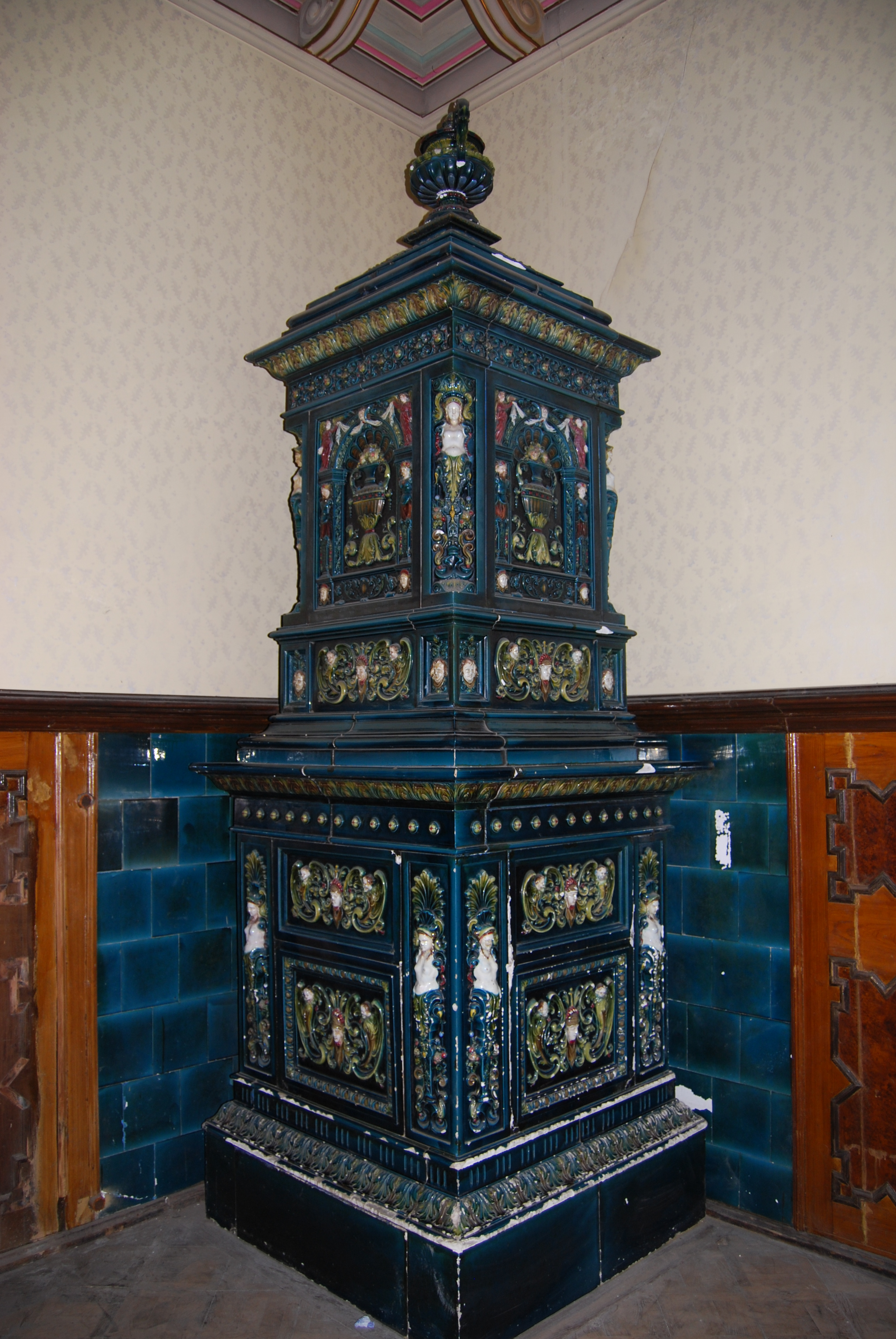

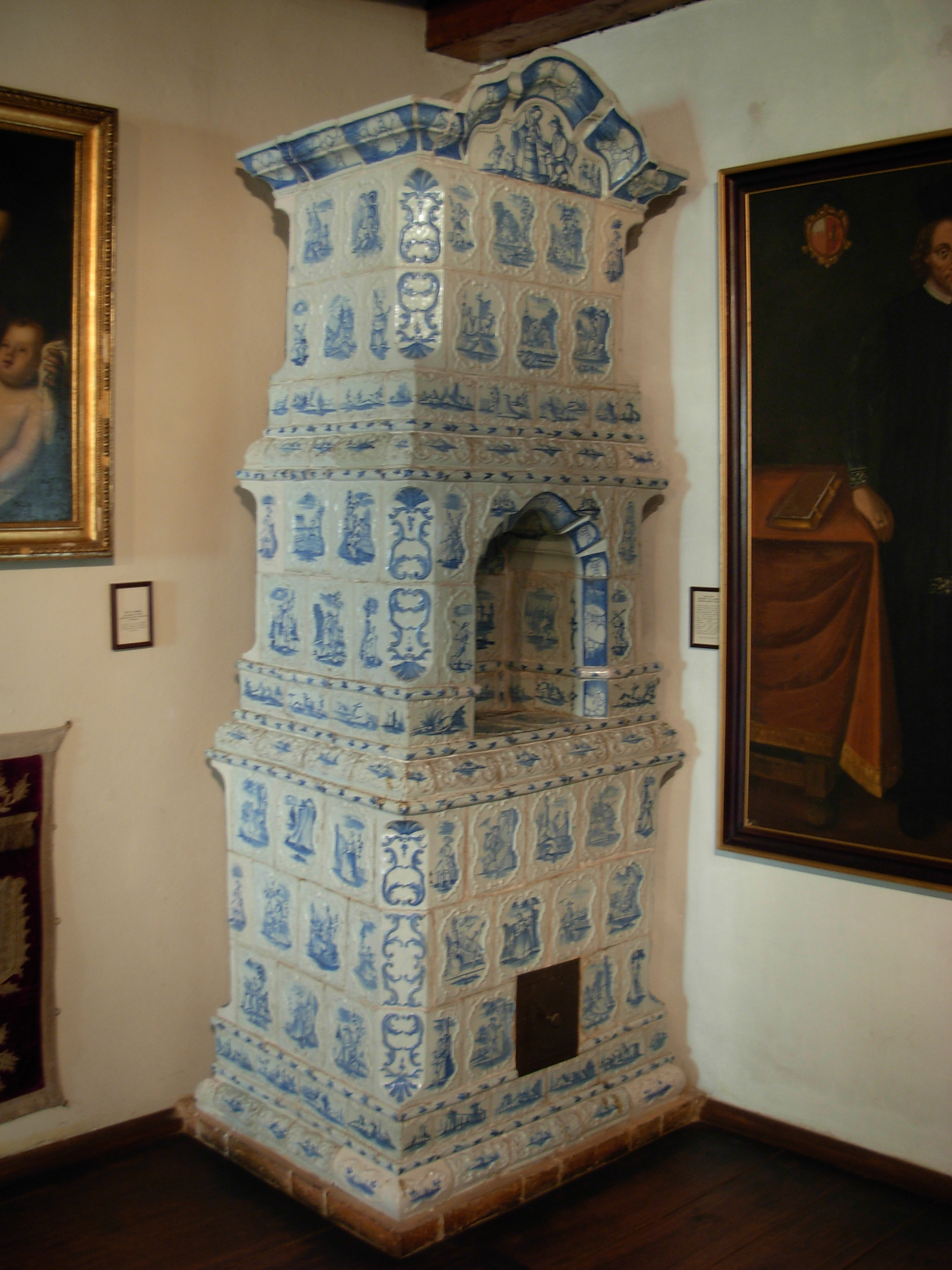

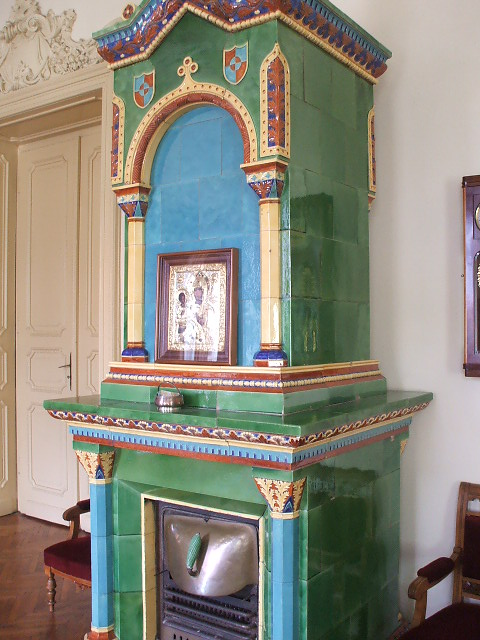

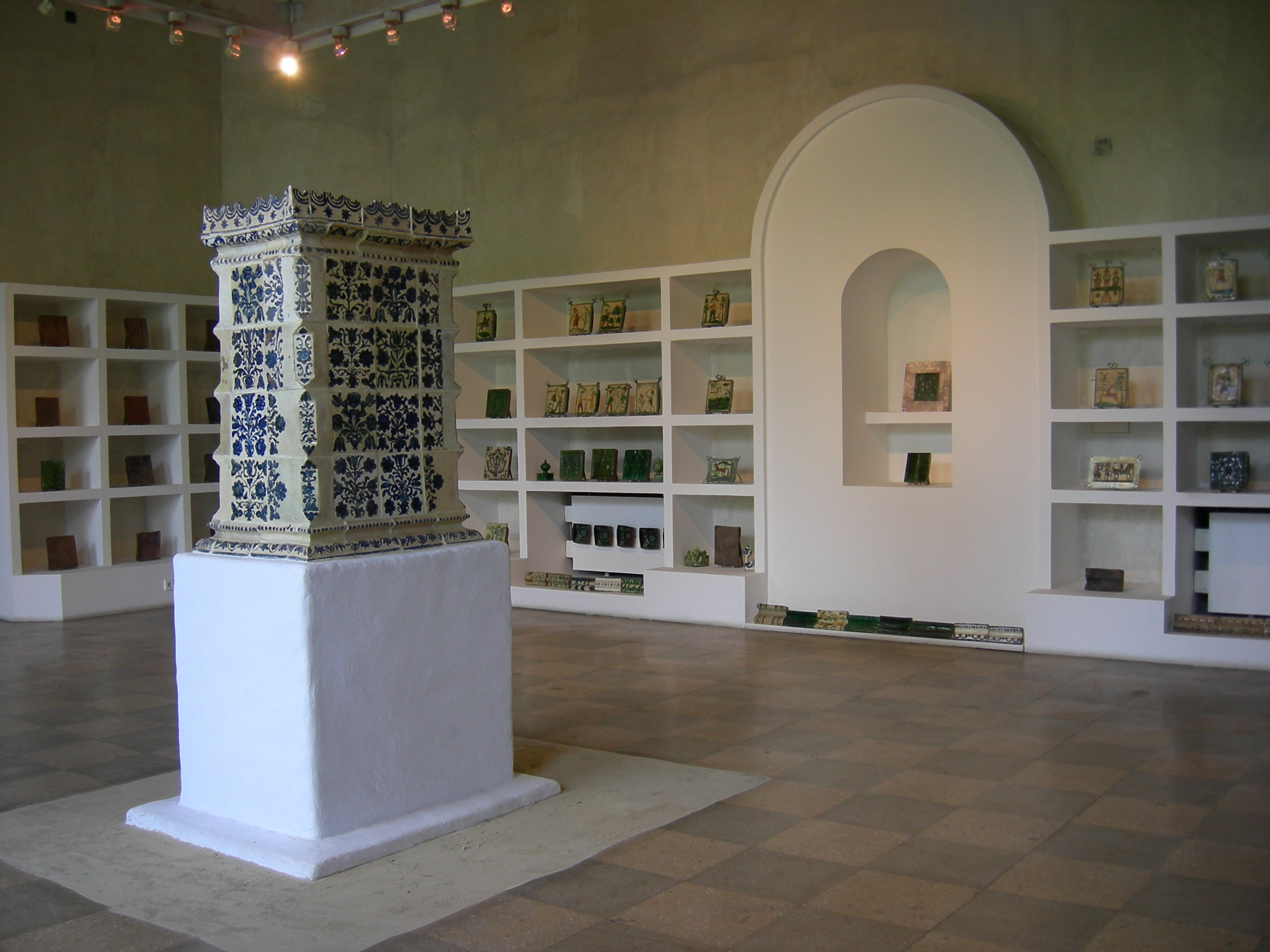

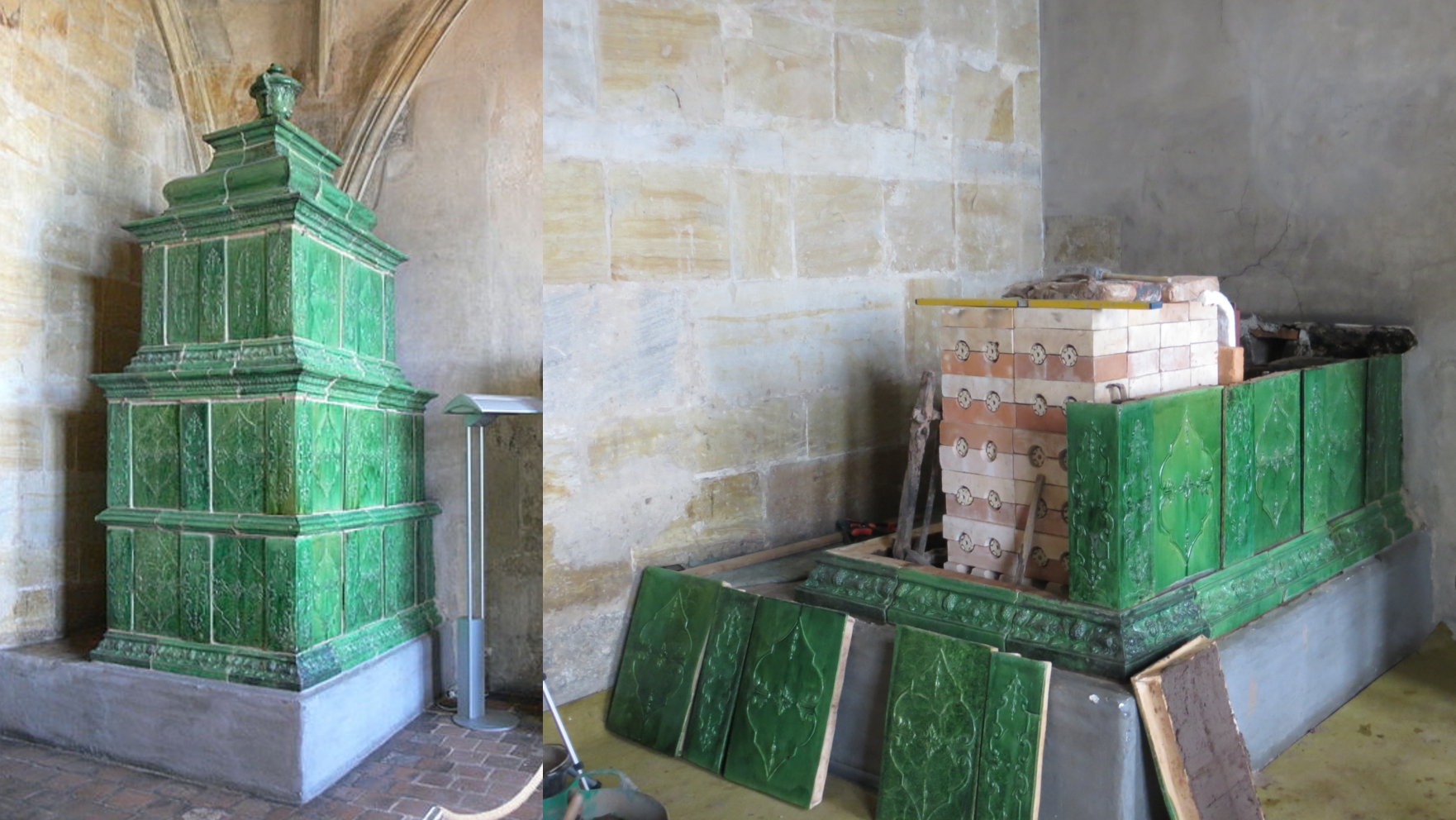

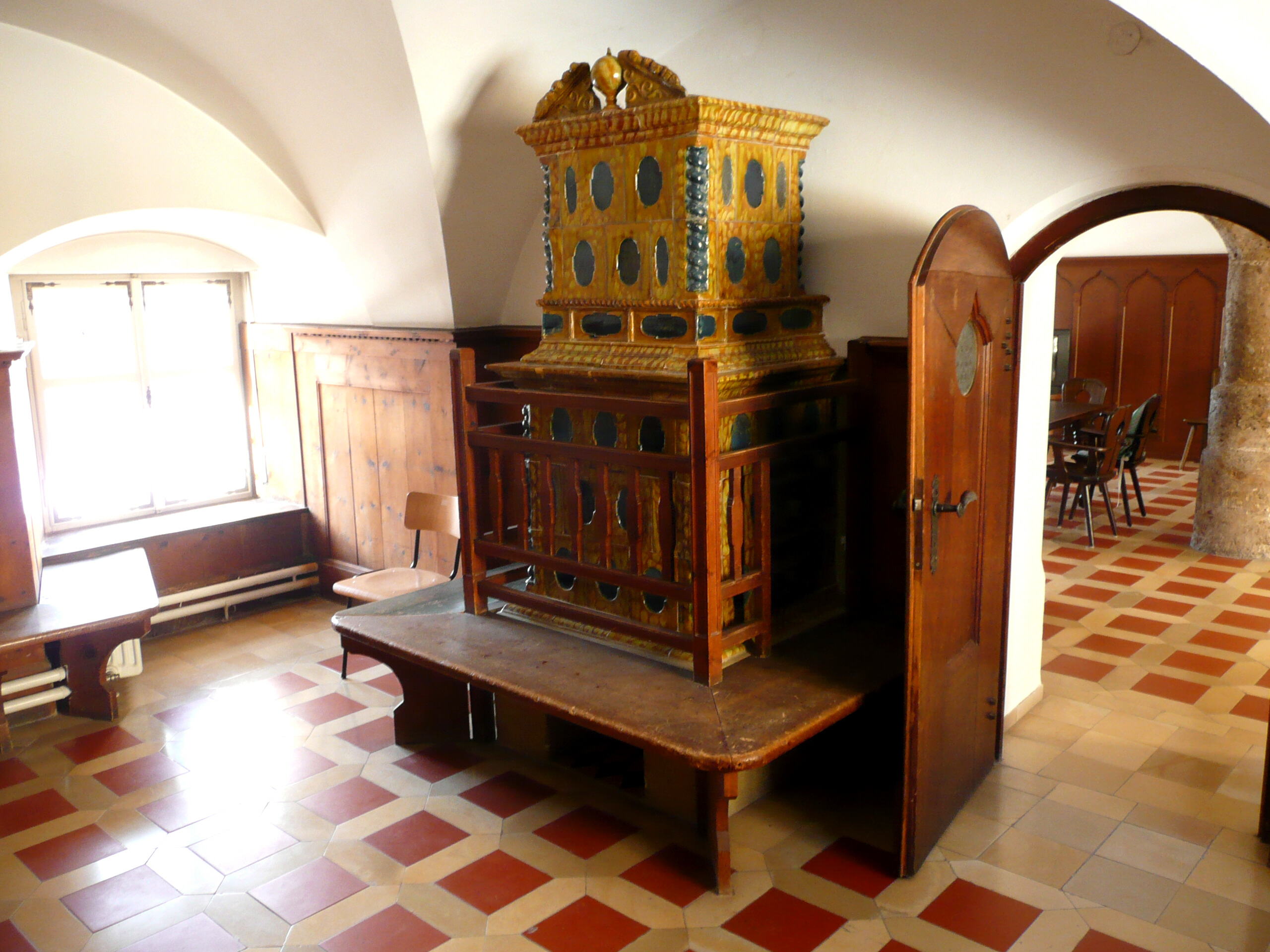

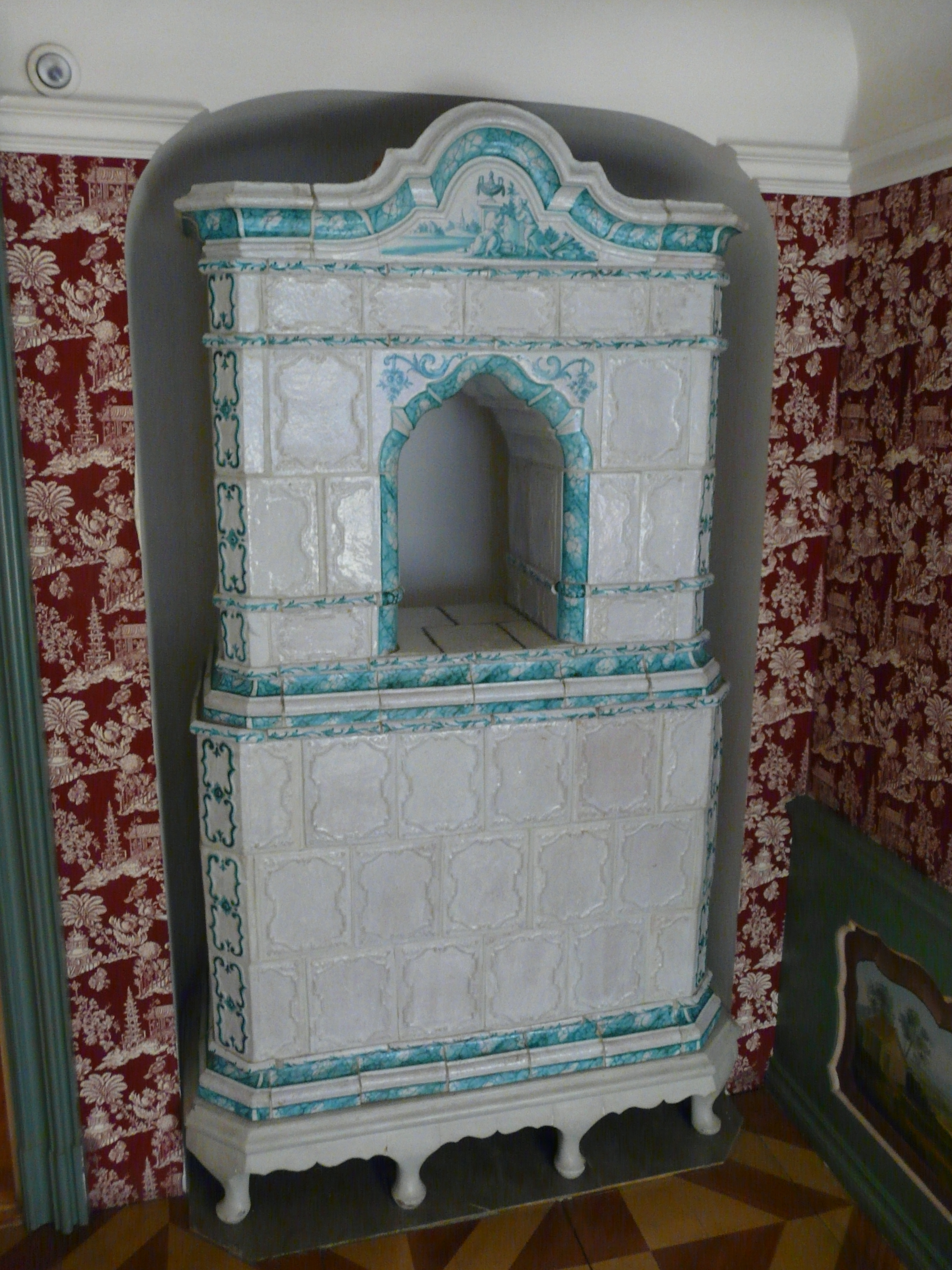

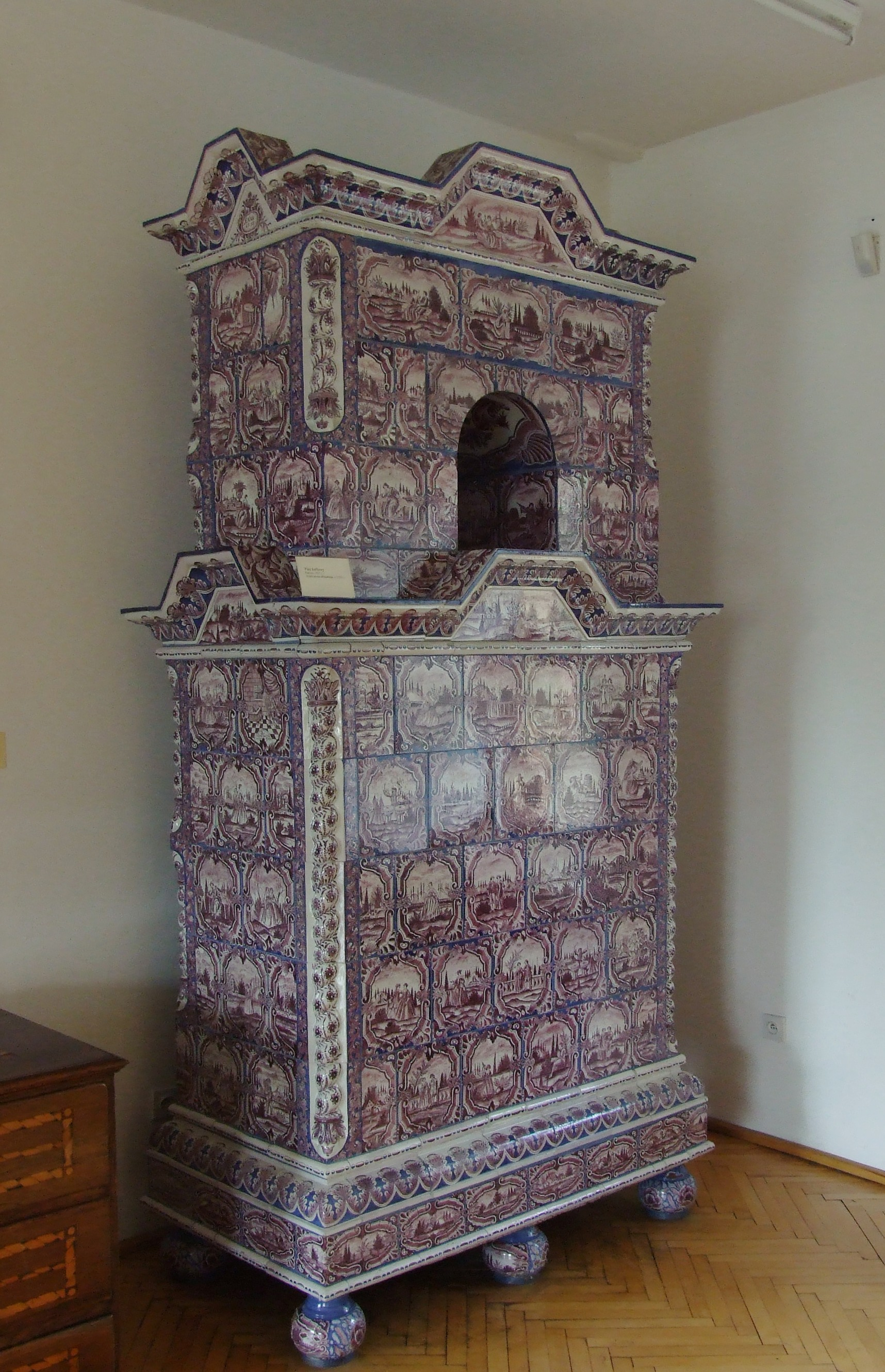

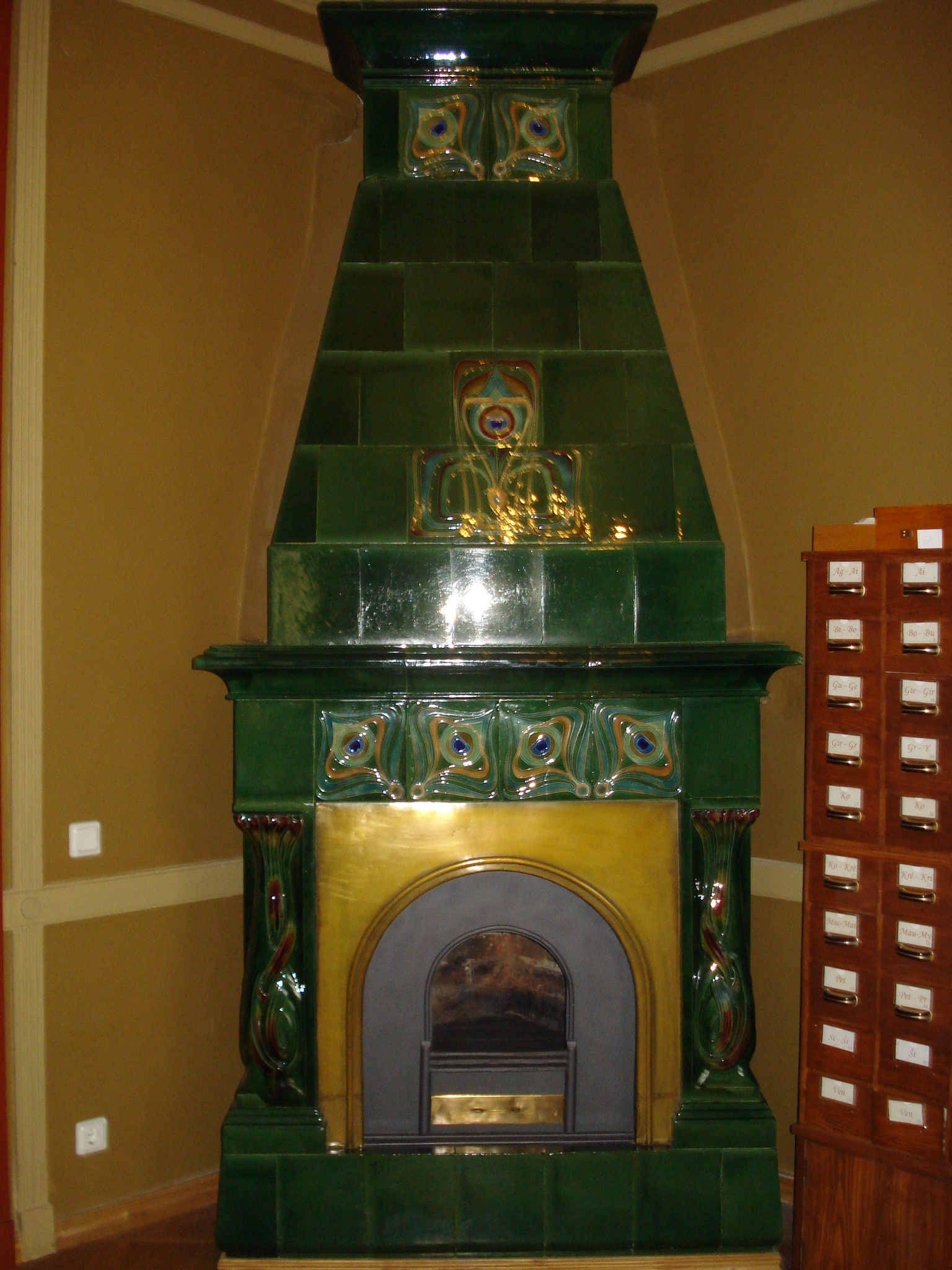

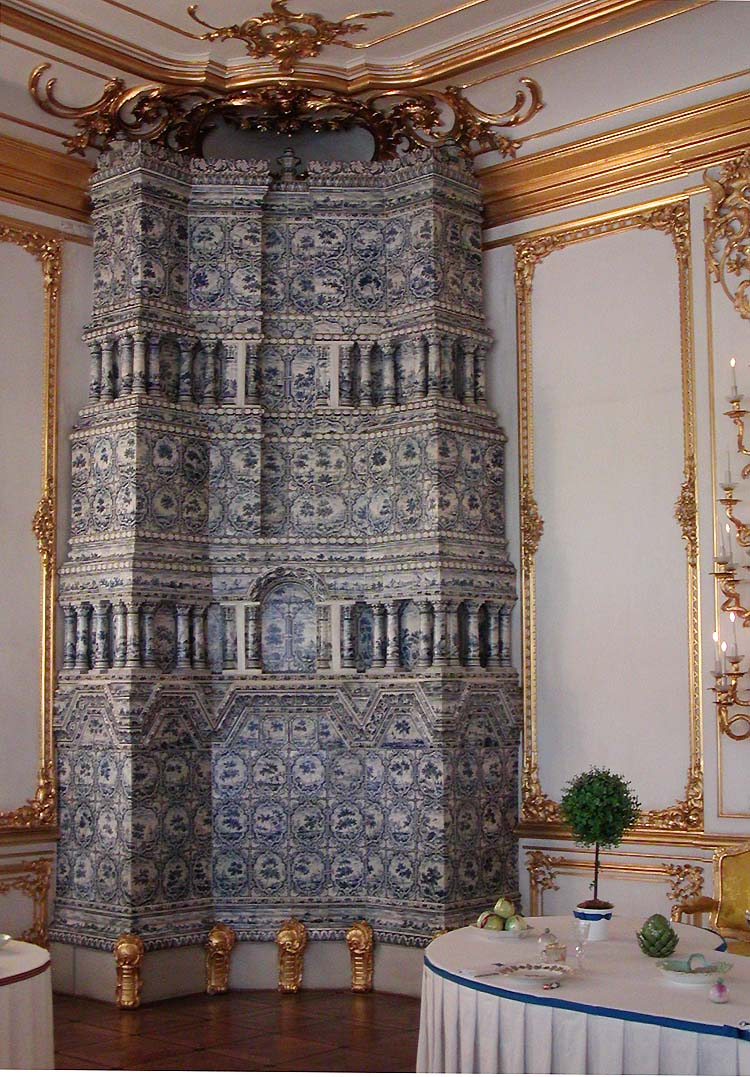

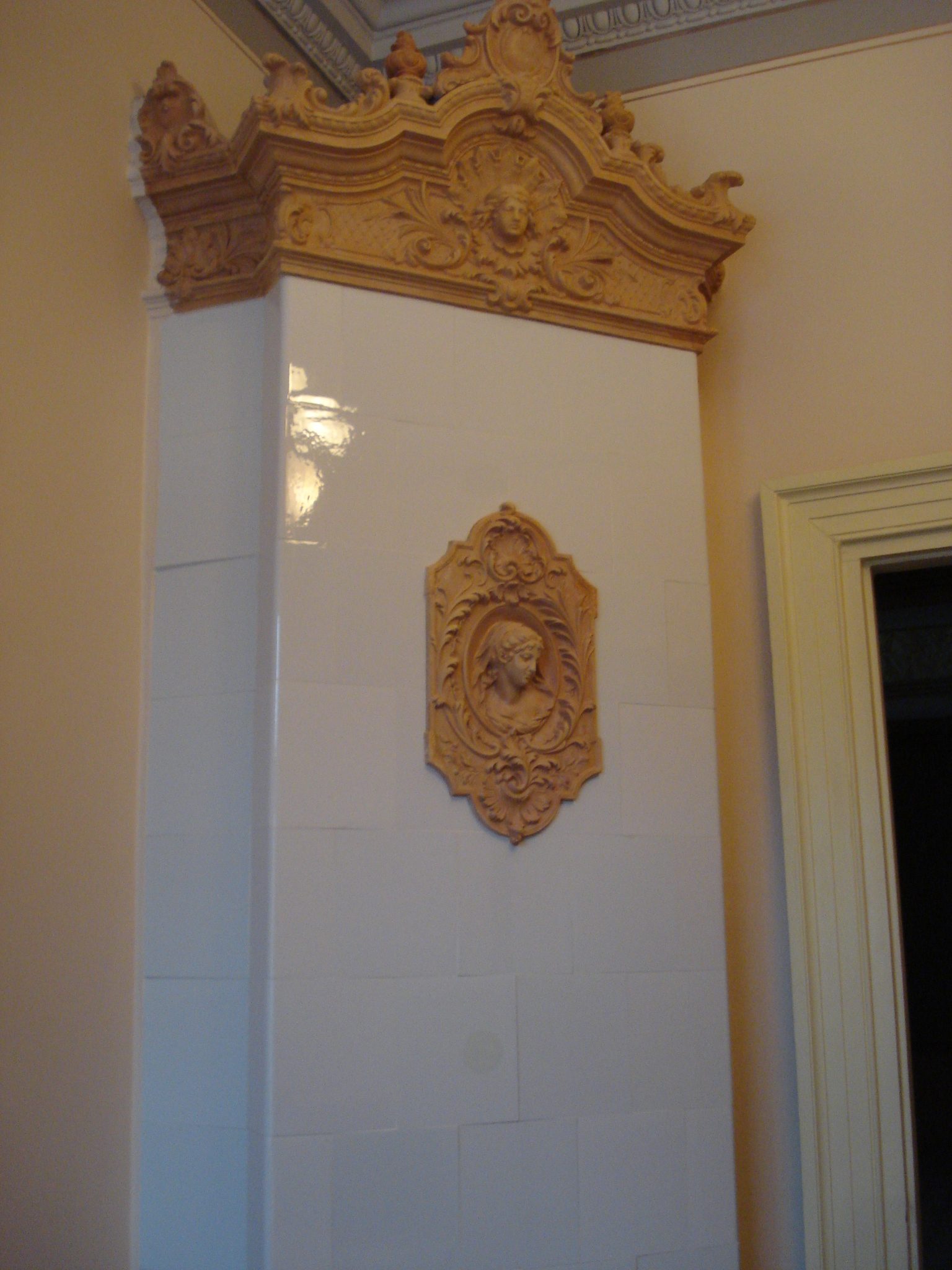

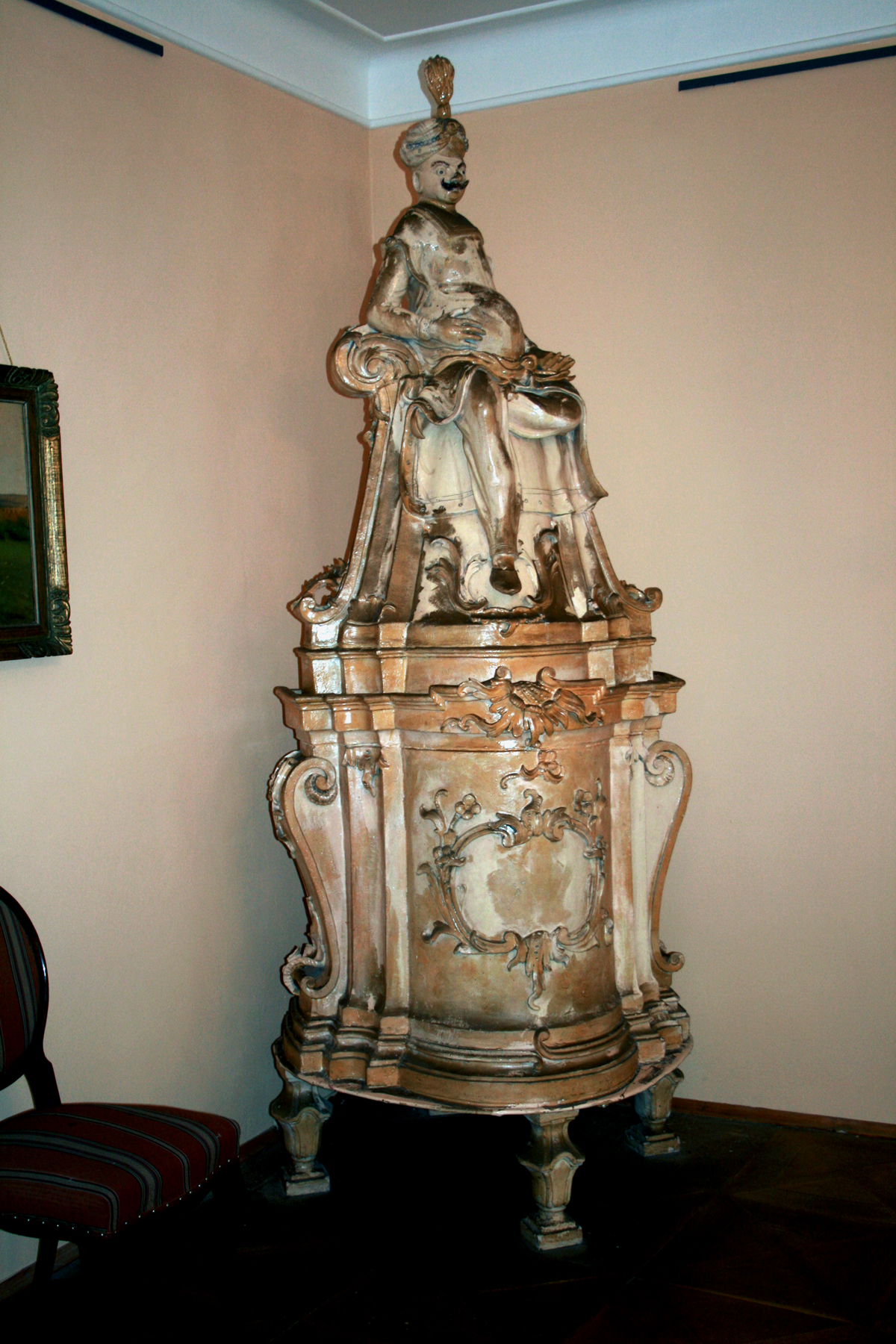

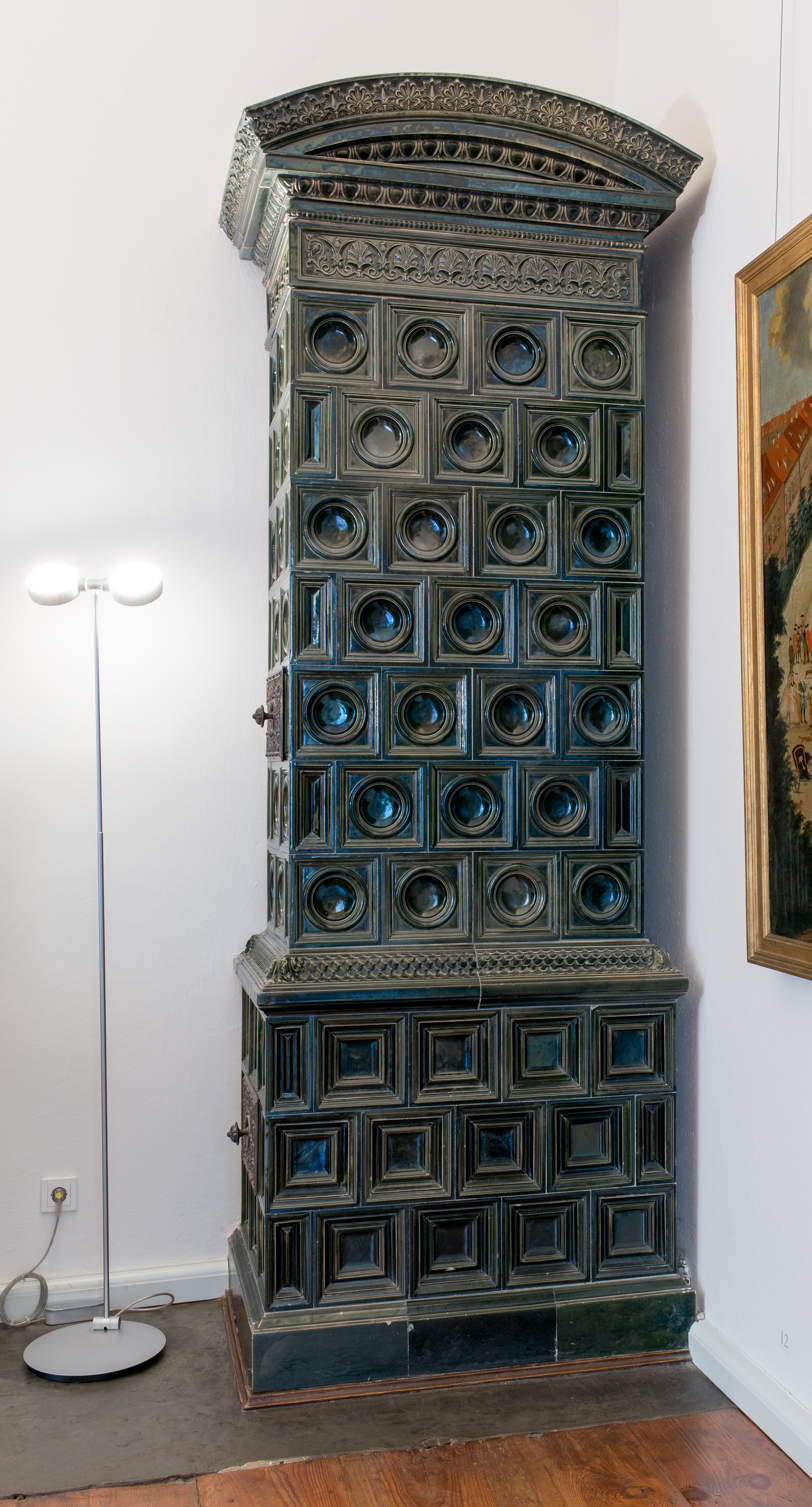

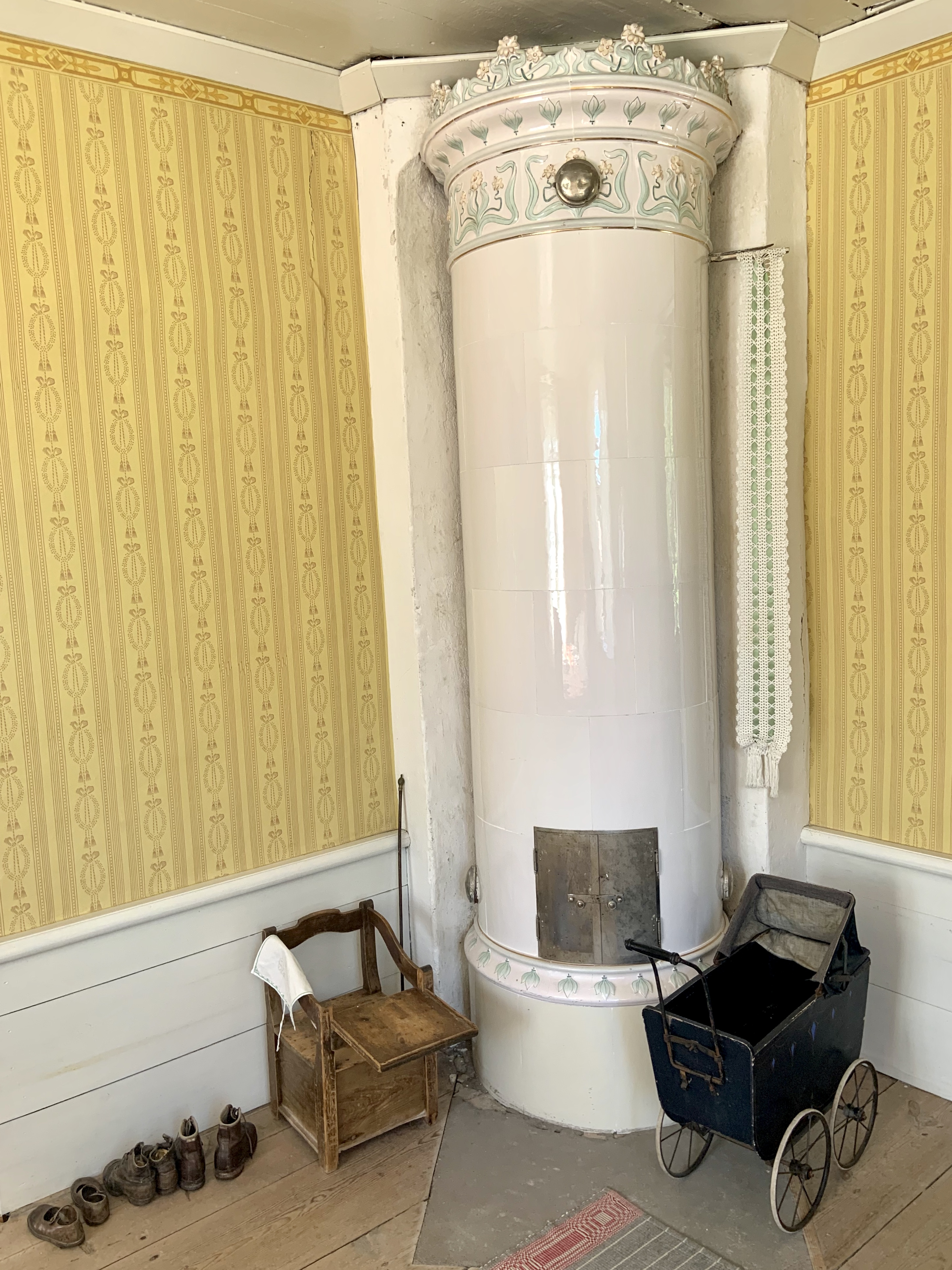

== See also ==
- Masonry heating:
  - Agungi (Korean)
  - Hypocaust (Greco-Roman)
  - Kang bed-stove (Chinese)
  - Ondol (Korean)
  - Rocket mass heater
  - Russian stove
- Fireplace
- Multifuel stove
- Woodburning stove
