= Miho Hamaguchi =

Japanese architect (1915–1988)

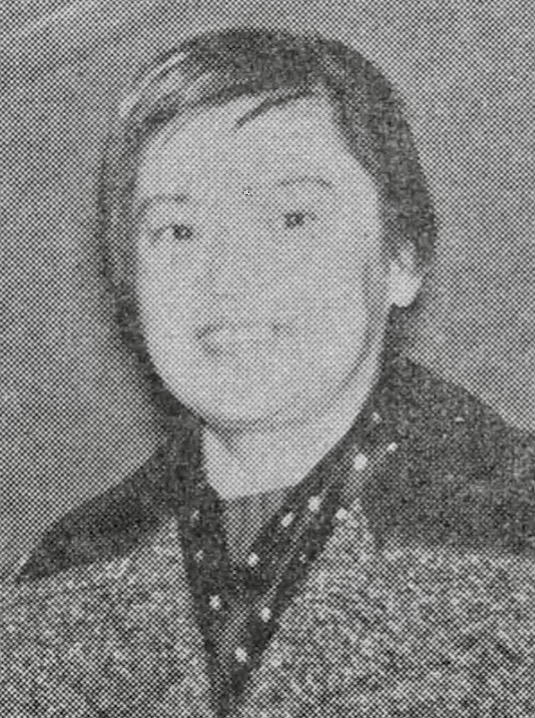
- Born: 浜口 ミホ; March 1, 1915
- Died: April 12, 1988 (aged 73)
- Occupation: Architect
- Known for: The Feudalism of Japanese Houses
- Notable work: modern Japanese kitchen design

Miho Hamaguchi (Japanese: 浜口 ミホ) (March 1, 1915 – April 12, 1988) was a Japanese architect and the first female architect to be licensed as a Class 1 architect in Japan.

== Early life and education ==
Hamaguchi was born to a well-to-do family, the Hamadas, in Dalian, China. She started her studies in home economics at what is now Ochanomizu University and would actively attend architectural lectures without enrolling as women were not officially permitted to do so. She went on to practice under Kunio Maekawa and later start her own firm in Aoyama.

== Domesticity and social change ==
Hamaguchi is credited with influencing and pioneering the modern Japanese kitchen. Her book, The Feudalism of Japanese Houses (Nihon jūtaku no hōkensei, 1949), advocated for the dissolution of gender and class hierarchies. Much of the residential realm at the time operated under traditional feudal structures in which spaces were meant to prioritize ‘the master of the house’ while women were reduced to the role of housekeeper. Later in the decades directly following the Second World War, the gendering of spaces changed to giving those considered more public and productive masculine associations while feminine spaces were those characterized by being private and domestic. To further emphasize this dynamic of gender and hierarchy of space, kitchens, being domestic, were considered secondary to more public and formal rooms intended to host gatherings, and as such, kitchens would be positioned on the peripheries of the house, hidden from sight.

Hamaguchi saw housing reform as not only a way to reduce the hierarchy in the domestic realm but also as a way to change the perception of women and their status within society. She is believed to have gone on to design thousands of houses, although the only known one that still remains in its original state is The G House, also known as the Nakamura House. Following the end of World War II, she was also given an opportunity by the Japan Housing Corporation to help with the reconstruction of housing through danchi apartments, in which she enacted much of her vision. The end of the war saw the rise of the middle class, leading to the dissolution of the role of the maid, meaning tasks once attributed to the maid now fell onto the wife. Under this context, Miho Hamaguchi implemented a combined kitchen-dining arrangement and centralized it within the house for better visibility while cooking. She also took advantage of the technological advancements of the time, such as electric appliances. This moved the kitchen-dining experience to a central part of family life and aided in nurturing relations within the nuclear family.

== Built works ==
- Kurita House
- Housing Corporation - Stainless Steel Sink
- G House (Former Nakamura House)
- Casa Marisol (1974)
- Kaiyo Club (1984, 1987)
