= Japanese kitchen =

Area of a Japanese house

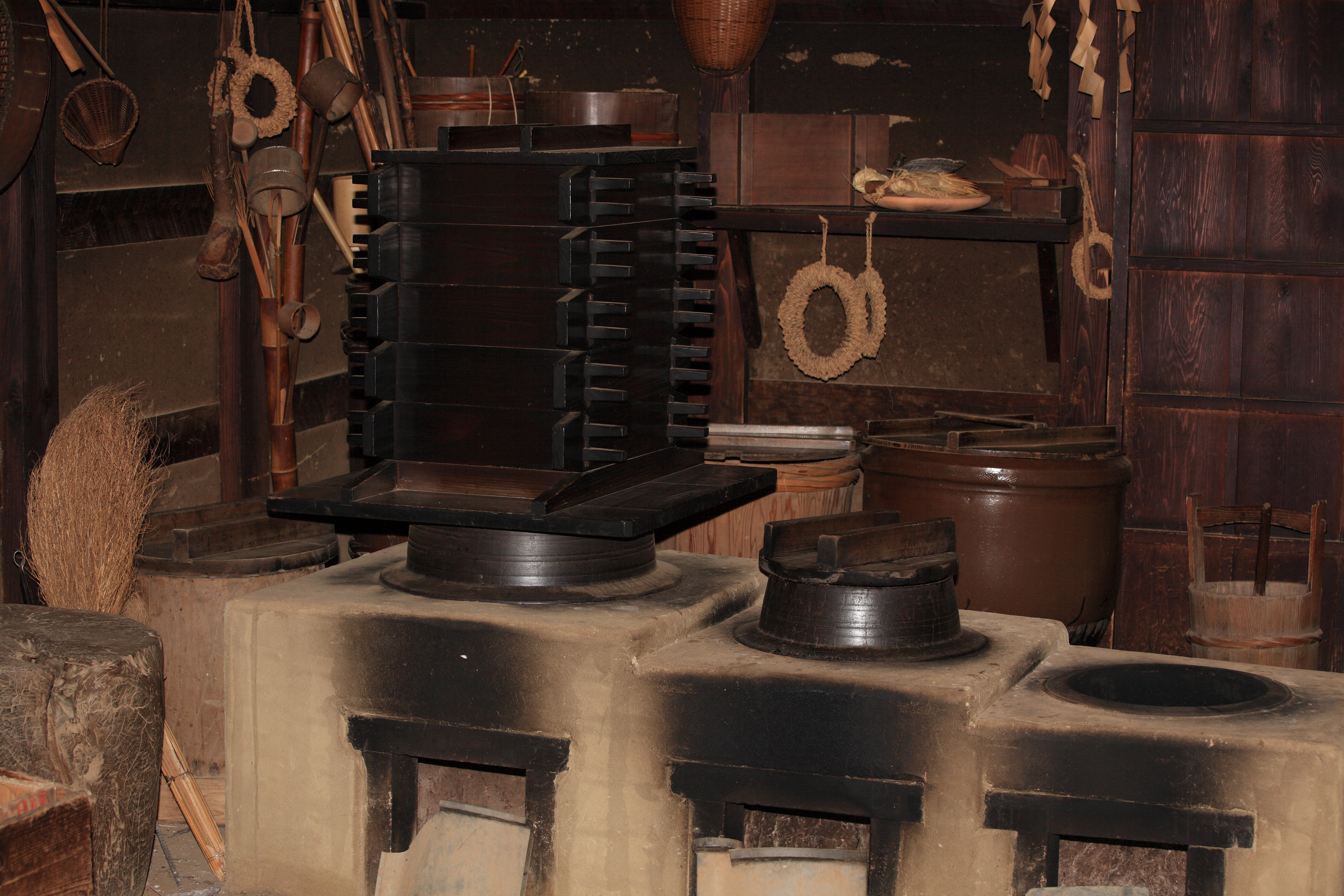
Traditional Japanese kitchen, Boso-no-Mura Museum, Inba-gun, Chiba-ken, Japan

The Japanese kitchen (Japanese: 台所, romanized: Daidokoro, lit. 'kitchen') is the place where food is prepared in a Japanese house. Until the Meiji era, a kitchen was also called kamado (かまど; meaning stove) and there are a number of sayings in the Japanese language that involve kamado as it was considered the symbol of a house. The term could even be used to mean "family" or "household" (much as "hearth" does in English). Separating a family was called kamado wo wakeru, or "divide the stove". Kamado wo yaburu (lit. "break the stove") means that the family was broken.

== Early history ==
In the Jōmon period, from the 10,000 BC to 300 BC, people gathered into villages, where they lived in shallow pit-houses. These simple huts were between 10 and 30 square meters and had a hearth in the center. Early stoves were nothing more than a shallow pit (jishōro 地床炉), but they were soon surrounded by stones to catch the fire sparks. A bottomless clay vase soon replaced the stones as these became hot quickly and occupants had to be careful around a stove. This type of stove is called maiyōro (埋甕炉; lit. "buried vase stove"). As the stove became safer, it was moved from the center of house to the side and, by the late Kofun period (6th century), almost all houses had a stove at one end of the house. Some rich families in the Kofun period built a separate house where cooking was done. In these houses, food was stored in sacks and pots in a hole dug on the floor. Houses were constructed near a river or a spring for easy access to water.

In the Yayoi period (300 BC to AD 250) the cultivation of rice became widespread, and villages would be constructed near a marsh and a lowland. The water was muddy and asaido (浅井戸), which means a shallow well, were constructed. An asaido was filled with sand and pebbles through which the water flowed to filter out mud and larger organisms. Some villages stored food outside a house in a large storehouse.

The kitchen remained unchanged for over 500 years, between the Nara period in the 8th century until the Muromachi period (1336–1573). Kitchens were furnished with the following items:

- Ashikanae or Ashimarokanae (足釜) – A nine- or ten-legged iron pot.
- Kakekanae or Kakemarokanae (懸釜) – An iron pot that was fitted over a stove. It had a "fringe" that let it hang on the stove and was used to boil cook rice into kayu.
- Yukikamado (行竈) – A pot, with a stove attached, that could be carried around
- Koshiki (橧 or 甑) – A wooden basket placed on top of a pot to steam cook rice.
- Nabe (堝 or 鍋) – made of clay or of metal. Primarily used to make stews and a side dish as well as to boil water.
- Sashinabe or Sasunabe (銚子, 刺名倍 or 佐志奈閇) – A small pot with a long handle used to warm sake in a bottle.
- Hiraka or Hotogi (瓫) – A large clay pot, larger than a nabe, used to boil water.
- Kamado – Also called Mushikamado: the stove itself, constructed with stones, tiles, and clay.
- Karakamado (韓竈) – A set of koshiki, kanahe (釜), and kamado that can be carried around.
- Takigi (薪) – In the Nara period, "薪" was read as "takigi" not "maki". Dried wood was used as fuel.
- Oke (麻筒) – A tub or a pail in three sizes: large, medium, and small. A flat bottomed and shallow tub was also used.
- Shaku (杓) – Also read as Hisago. A wooden ladle used to scoop cold and hot water from an oke.
- Katana (刀子) – A cooking knife and not a katana.
- Kiritsukue or Sekki (切机) – A Manaita (俎) or a cutting board.
- Fune (船) – A large wooden tub used for washing.
- Shitami (籮) – A coarse hemp cloth used to squeeze water out or to dry foods by spreading over it.
- Kame (甕) – A large vase where foods were stored.

In the Heian period (794–1185), the first usage of the precursor to "daidokoro", or pantry, was recorded. The imperial palace of Heian had four rooms dedicated to preparing foods, oni no ma (鬼の間), daibandokoro (台盤所), asagarei no ma (朝餉の間), and Ōidono (大炊殿). "Oni no ma" was the room used for checking for poison and tasting before serving. "Asagarei no ma" was the room for eating breakfast. "Ōidono" was the room to cook foods and was placed to the north and as far away as possible from living quarters. "Daibandokoro" was the room used to serve foods onto a daiban (台盤), a lacquered wooden table. Maid servants also ate and waited to serve meals in the daibandokoro.

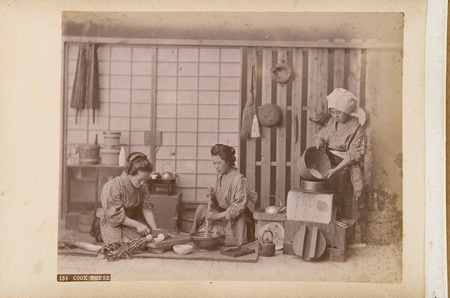
Three women cooking in a Japanese cook house

In the Kamakura period (1185–1333), as the Shoinzukuri style of housing became common, the kitchen was gradually absorbed into the house. Until then, a kitchen was built as a separate house whenever possible to avoid smells and smoke, and to prevent possible kitchen fires from spreading to the primary residence. Kamakura era kitchens did not include essential kitchen furnishings, such as a sink or a well.

== Fire and water ==
=== Stoves ===
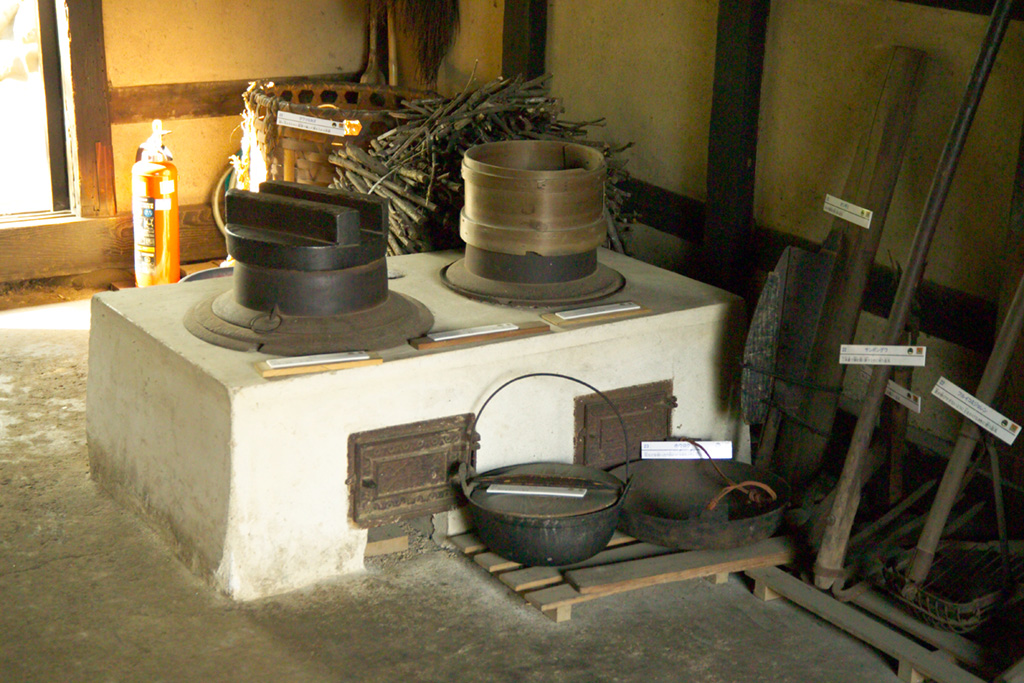
A kamado in a traditional Japanese kitchen

The earliest dwellings in Japan used an open fire hearth for cooking. The first stove was recorded in the Kofun period, between the 3rd to 6th century. These stoves, called kamado, were typically made of clay and sand; they were fired through a hole in the front and had a hole in the top, into which a pot could be suspended from its rim. This type of stove remained in use for centuries to come, with only minor modifications. In the 14th century, in the Muromachi period, stoves with two holes were recorded in drawings. By the early 17th century, the beginning of the Edo period, large stoves with several cooking holes were common in the kitchens of the upper-class house as well as in large restaurants. It is believed these multiple hole types appeared earlier than recorded but were omitted from drawings of the time because inclusion of a single hole stove was sufficient to indicate a kitchen. The stove was low, meaning cooks had to squat to cook. In the larger kitchens, especially those of palaces and temples, raised kamado that could be operated while standing up were developed in the Edo period (1603–1867).

Irori (囲炉裏、いろり) appeared in the Kofun period and served as a secondary stove. A section of wooden panels were removed from the floor and a lacquered square wooden frame was fitted in the place. The frame was filled with sand and an iron hook was lowered from the ceiling. Foods were reheated or cooked over in an iron pot hung from a hook and the fire served as a heat source. This type of stove became common in multiple homes by the early Nara period and a smaller irori is the center piece of a tea house.

A third type of stove, a hibachi (火鉢, ひばち; lit. 'fire pot'), appeared as late as the early Heian period but is likely to have been used earlier. A hibachi is a deep small pot half filled with sand and ash and a small fire was started in the pot. It was used as a safer form of heating equipment than was available previously and could be used to cook small morsels of food.

=== Water ===
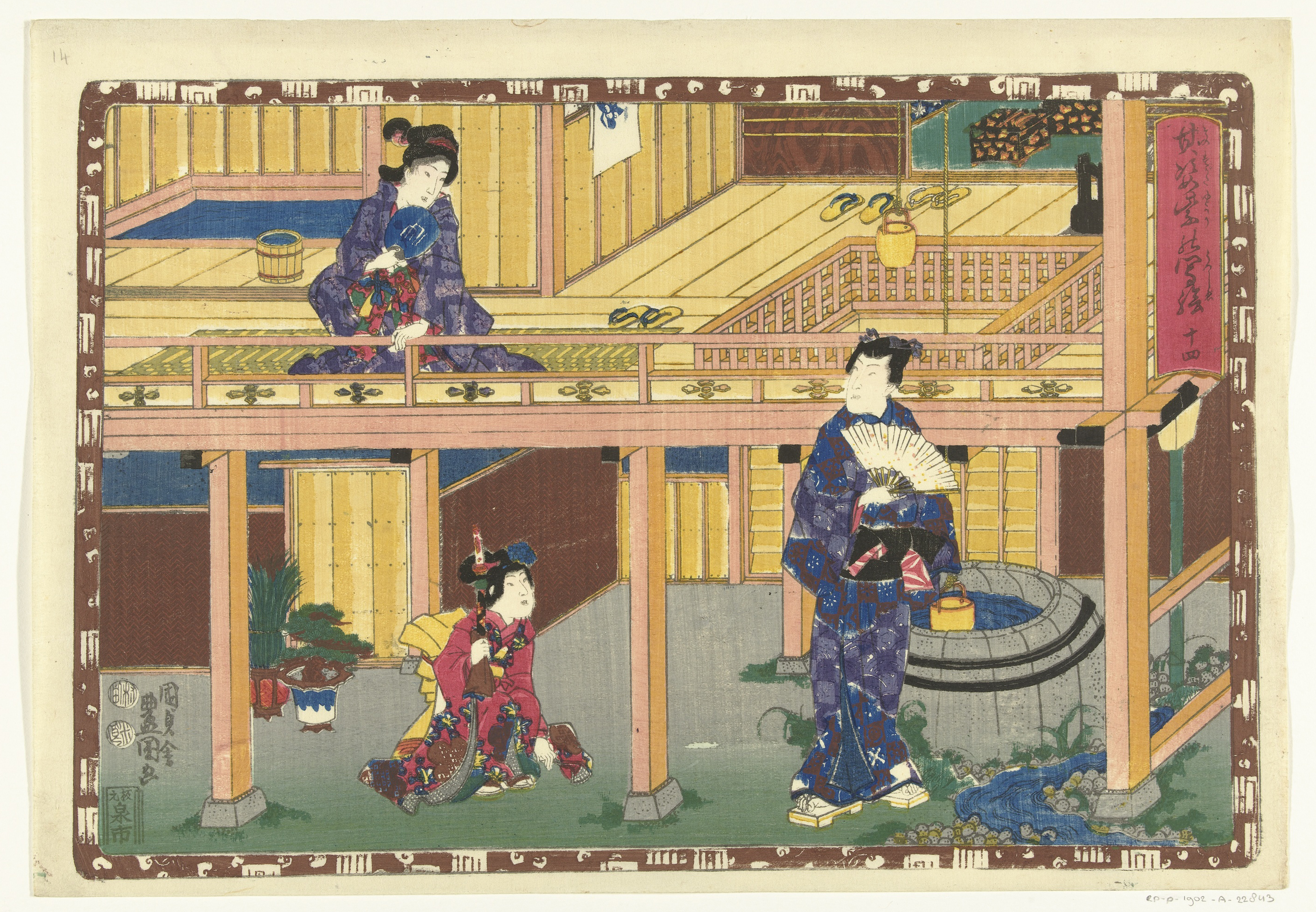
Elaborate water provisions appear in the background of this mid-1800s illustration.

Fire was a part of a kitchen from the start, but water was late in becoming a part.

In the Yayoi period (300 BC to AD 250), the cultivation of rice became widespread, and villages would be constructed near a marsh and a lowland. The water was muddy and asaido (浅井戸) lit.) shallow wells, were constructed. An asaido was filled with sand and pebbles through which the water flowed to filter out mud and larger organisms. A deeper well was also dug and sometimes a hollowed log was inserted into the well to prevent the walls' collapse. A pot was used to scoop water.

It was not long before people started improving on these primitive wells. The area around a well was tiled with stones, then fune (水船) was invented. Wooden or bamboo shafts were used to carry water from nearby wells and springs to a fune, or it was manually filled by women. Water was carried from these fune to a water vase whence it was used. Sometimes a fune was made inside a house, but it did not have the function of a sink. It was used to collect and store water and nothing more. Fune later became a part of a Japanese garden.

The first time that a sink appeared in a drawing was in the Bokie (慕帰絵) written in the early Muromachi period. The kitchen of the Nanrou temple (南瀧院) had a large sunokoyuka (すのこ床; lit. 'drainboard floor'), next to a stove with a water filled oke and hisyaku (syaku) for washing. This sunokoyuka was made with split bamboo and water would drain through gaps between the canes. Even though in a number of places a sunokoyuka was made over a river and washing was done, to make a part of the kitchen floor into sunokoyuka to use as a drain was an innovation. This did not pose a health problem as kitchen scraps were meticulously collected and used to make a compost. Few Japanese ate meat due to the Emperor's decree in the 8th century and animals and birds were slaughtered away from a house. Until late Edo period, this type of kitchen was widely used.

== Shoin-zukuri and the kitchen ==
Shoin-zukuri became the standard style of building a house beginning in the 13th century and it was revolutionary for combining fire (stove) and water (well and drain) into a single place. It was still few steps short of a kitchen. In the early stage of Shoinzukuri style, instead of the kitchen being a room inside the omoya (母屋) or the main building, it was connected by a corridor and existed inside one of multiple sub-buildings. However, it did have a kamado, a irori, a well, and a sunokoyuka in the same room.

In the Edo period (1603 to 1868), daidokoro came to mean "kitchen" and became an integrated part of the house. It was, however, more common to call it katte (勝手) which is used to mean the "back door". The pantry room was called ozentate (御膳立). Upper-class houses were well stocked and extremely large by today's standard. The country house of Tokugawa Mitsukuni, known as a gourmet of Edo period, had kitchen spaces at least 34 jyou or about 53 square metres. This is more than one-third of the entire house and does not include the sake storage room or the pantry. Some kitchens had running water by having bamboo shafts connected to the water source extend into the kitchen; users of less well equipped kitchens fetched water from a common well. A separate kitchen within the house had become customary and all but the smallest single-room houses had one.

Storage in kitchens was provided by mizuya tansu. These are Japanese style chests, often with a mix of compartments behind sliding doors and drawers of varying sizes. These are still available today as antiques, or altered reproductions tailored to a more modern/western style of kitchen.

== Industrialization ==
An American scientist, Edward S. Morse, recorded a number of the kitchens in urban and rural areas in the early Meiji period (1868–1912). These kitchens were not much different from those in the Edo period as home use of gas and electricity had only just begun in America and Europe. Though it was costly to lay down infrastructures, these were dutifully laid down, with heavy subsidization by semi-private and national companies.

The early 1900s brought a change in Japanese cuisine. Foreign cuisines from every part of the world flooded Japanese cookbooks, part of the haikara boom (ハイカラ, literally high collared, taken from high-collared coats popular in Europe). Popular dishes like curried rice, sukiyaki, ramen, and gyūdon appeared during the Meiji period as a part of the haikara movement and represented a fusing of traditional Japanese cuisines with other cuisines. Kitchens were completely reorganized to cook these foods; kitchens of the Edo period were used for simple menus of rice, broiled fish, vegetable soup, and pickled vegetables.

The first gas light was installed in Yokohama by 1873, but it would be more than 30 years before advertisements for the gas started appearing in newspapers. These ads were not directed at middle to lower classes. In the 1908 study of how gas was used in Tokyo, 57% was for lighting, 14% was for fuel, 19% was for powering motors, and 3% was for streetlights. This meant that gas was used to light only 1 out of 9 households and only 1 out of 100 households used gas for cooking. Gas companies realized this, and early appliances were directly imported from England which made them too costly for all but the richest citizens.

The Japanese kitchen turned away from American and European kitchens at this point. The first item of the industrialization to be introduced to most houses was the gas-heated rice cooker. A gas stove were introduced much later as the cost of gas was still too high for most homes. A gas oven, often an essential part of the kitchen in multiple American and European houses, never made it into most Japanese households because dishes requiring cooking in an oven, such as roasted chicken and baked pies, became popular only much later. Instead of an oven, a smaller fish oven was fitted into a gas stove. The gas-heated rice cooker remained in use until the 1970s in multiple houses and was eventually replaced by the electric rice cooker.

In the 1920s, electricity became more widespread in homes in Japan. In Nihonkatei daihyakkajiten (literally Encyclopedia of Japanese Household) published in 1927, there is already an entry of "katei denka" meaning a completely electric house. It says,

The most important reason to use electricity for all needs of a house, lighting, heat, power is because it will help women to work, increasing their efficiency, make living easier and comfortable, and also make it economical. There must be several electrical outlets in each room to easily use an appliance like electric heater. They also let occupants use electric light at any time and no one can forget the comfort of using appliances like an electric fan, an electric heater, an electric toaster, a coffee maker, an electric iron, and an electric curling iron.

...Placing various electric appliances (in a kitchen) and cooking with them is essential to making it easier to work in this small space. An electric stove, an electric oven, an electric refrigerator, an electric dishwashers, etc. must be wired properly in appropriate spaces.

This, however, did not mean that a completely electric house had become common. In 1937, J. G. Douglass from General Electric conducted a half-year research on how many electric appliances made into a common household. According to this report:

- Electric iron – 3,131,000 (approximately 120,000 in Tokyo area)
- Refrigerator – 12,215 (4,700)
- Room cooler – 260 (125)
- Vacuum cleaner – 6,610 (3,100)
- Washing machine – 3,197 (1,590)

This research project also predicted that four years later, in 1941, electric appliances should be much more widely used. A 490% increase was predicted for the refrigerator, 470% increase for the vacuum cleaner, and 150% increase for iron.

The first public water service began on October 17, 1887, in Yokohama. By the early 1900s, most major cities had water services. However, these water pipes often led to public water taps. In 1892, a survey conducted in Yokohama revealed that less than 1 in 4 households had a private water tap. 18,184 households used public water taps, while only 5,120 household used private water taps. By the 1930s, most new houses were constructed with a private water taps, but it would take another 30 years to become available in a village far from a city.

== The "ordinary person's dream kitchen" ==
In 1912, a progressive woman's magazine Fujin no tomo (婦人の友) ran a contest for a heiminteki risouno daidokoro (平民的理想の台所), or "ordinary people's sophisticated kitchen". Heimin, literally "average person", was a popular phrase in the 1910s and 1920s, and it implied a well-educated and progressive person. Fifty-two contest entries were sent by readers, and two were awarded grand prizes. These winners were called "the city kitchen" and "the village kitchen".

The city kitchen was about 15.5 square metres (167 sq ft) in size and was intended to be used by a wife and her mother-in-law. The kitchen had doors leading to the dining room, the bath, and the laundry area. It had a wooden floor, roughly one-fourth of which included underfloor food storage lined with concrete. Two kamado were at one end, and a separate portable stove using charcoal was set up in the middle of the room. Next to the kamado was a stone sink without a water tap. Next to this sink were storage shelves with pots and pans on top, washed dishes in the middle, and vegetables and miso on the bottom. Next to the portable stove was a large food preparation table, with several drawers to store cooking utensils. Staples such as rice, sugar, and flour were kept in pots beneath this table. Additional shelves at the other end of the room could be accessed from both the kitchen and the dining room. Next to these shelves was another preparation table where foods were served onto individual dishes and then carried to the dining room. Kitchen windows and shoji were installed with glass panes to make the kitchen brighter, and electric lights were hung from the ceiling. This "dream kitchen" was spacious by today's standards, yet it lacked most modern post-industrial conveniences, although a number of smaller improvements had been made.

Also around this time, families started to use a low table called chabudai. Everyone sat around it, rather than using individual daiban. Until the 1960s, sitting on chairs and eating around a dining table was considered "haikara".

== The kitchen in the Taishō period ==
In the Taishō period (1912–1926), a popular movement called "Taishō Democracy" began. Its main focus was on universal suffrage for males, and this movement extended into other fields, serving as a modernization effort similar to the Meiji Restoration. The kitchen was affected.

Before the Taishō period, the kitchen was constructed so that most tasks could be done while sitting, crouching, or kneeling. This was due to long preparation and cooking times and helped keep the stove low to prevent the spread of fire. As gas stoves and European-style clothes became popular, kitchens were redesigned so they could be used while standing. A second innovation was that instead of placing the stove and water sink in a sunken, dirt-floored section of the kitchen, the stove was constructed on the same level as the rest of the kitchen, eliminating the need for stepping into footwear to attend it.

In 1922, Suzuki Shougyou began marketing a customizable kitchen set that came to be called the "System Kitchen". A number of its parts were prefabricated, and it could be made to fit in a space anywhere from 1.8 to 2.7 metres, the length of one to one-and-one-half tatami mats. The System Kitchen had a water sink, a cutting board, two or more gas stoves (not included), and cabinets for storage. This Suzuki kitchen was expensive, costing 120 yen at a time when a first-year bank worker earned only 50 yen per month. Today the same worker earns over 240,000 yen or about 2,400 dollars in a month.

By the end of the Taishō period, it was becoming increasingly difficult to have a maid to help around the house. This means that the kitchen had to be smaller for a housewife working alone. Whereas a European Frankfurt kitchen measured 1.9m by 3.4m, or 6.46 square metres, Japanese pushed for an even smaller size, 1 tsubo or 3.3 square metres, the area of two tatami mats. Three sides of these kitchens were filled with cupboards, stoves, storage areas, and a water sink.

== The post-war kitchen ==
Miho Hamaguchi's 1949 book, Feudalism in Japanese Houses (Nihon jūtaku no hōkensei), identified the kitchen as a tool to dissolve gender hierarchies and reject feudal systems in Japanese society. Many Japanese houses were destroyed in World War II, and architects redesigned houses as well as kitchens without the influence of Edo-period lifestyles. Working with the Japan Housing Corporation, Hamaguchi designed danchi kitchens with modern conveniences of electricity and gas, rather than a maid, that were connected to the rest of the domicile.

However, early post-war housing projects were often poorly designed. Sometimes architects simply copied plans for American or European housing projects, with only minor modifications to better suit Japanese families. Kitchens were small and soon became cluttered with new electric appliances. The "System Kitchen" approach to design was intended to make the kitchen easier for the average housewife to use. Since most families cook multiple types of cuisine in their kitchens, a streamlined cooking process was studied, focusing on how the kitchen was actually used. In a system kitchen, the refrigerator and other electrical appliances were placed in predesigned locations, and storage spaces were subdivided to house pots, pans and kitchen utensils.

== Contemporary ==
A typical Japanese kitchen

A typical modern Japanese kitchen includes the following:

- Counter: Countertop is usually made of cultured marble, but wood or natural stone is used for higher-end kitchens and stainless steel are used for commercial or lower-end kitchens.
- Large sink
- Cabinets
- Refrigerator and freezer: Especially in smaller kitchens for apartments, the top is usually low enough to use as an additional surface, particularly for appliances, similar to Western dormitory-sized refrigerator/freezers. In larger kitchens, full height refrigerators are common.
- Gas or induction stove: In smaller kitchens, there are only one or two burners, while more often it is three to four burners, with a narrow grill underneath for fish or vegetables. In the low-end apartments, stoves are often not built-in but rather a counter-top appliance, which is attached with a hose to a gas or power outlet. In case of earthquakes, the gas tap is to be turned off to prevent fires.
- Electric rice cooker: Over 95% of Japanese houses have one.
- Electric water boiler or kettle, particularly for making tea, but also instant ramen
- Toaster oven
- Microwave oven or convection microwave
- Extractor hood or fan

Notably absent are large ovens and dishwashers. Large gas ovens are found in some kitchens, particularly in higher-end dwellings, but in most kitchens, convection microwaves are used instead. Dishwashers can commonly be found in the kitchens of houses and condominiums, but rarely in apartments.

Portable vacuum flasks are popular for carrying home-brewed tea, particularly hot tea in the winter and cold tea in the summer, particularly cold oolong tea.

== See also ==
- Mizuya
- Kamado
- Housing in Japan
- Category:Japanese food preparation utensils
