= Russian stove =

Type of wood burning masonry stove

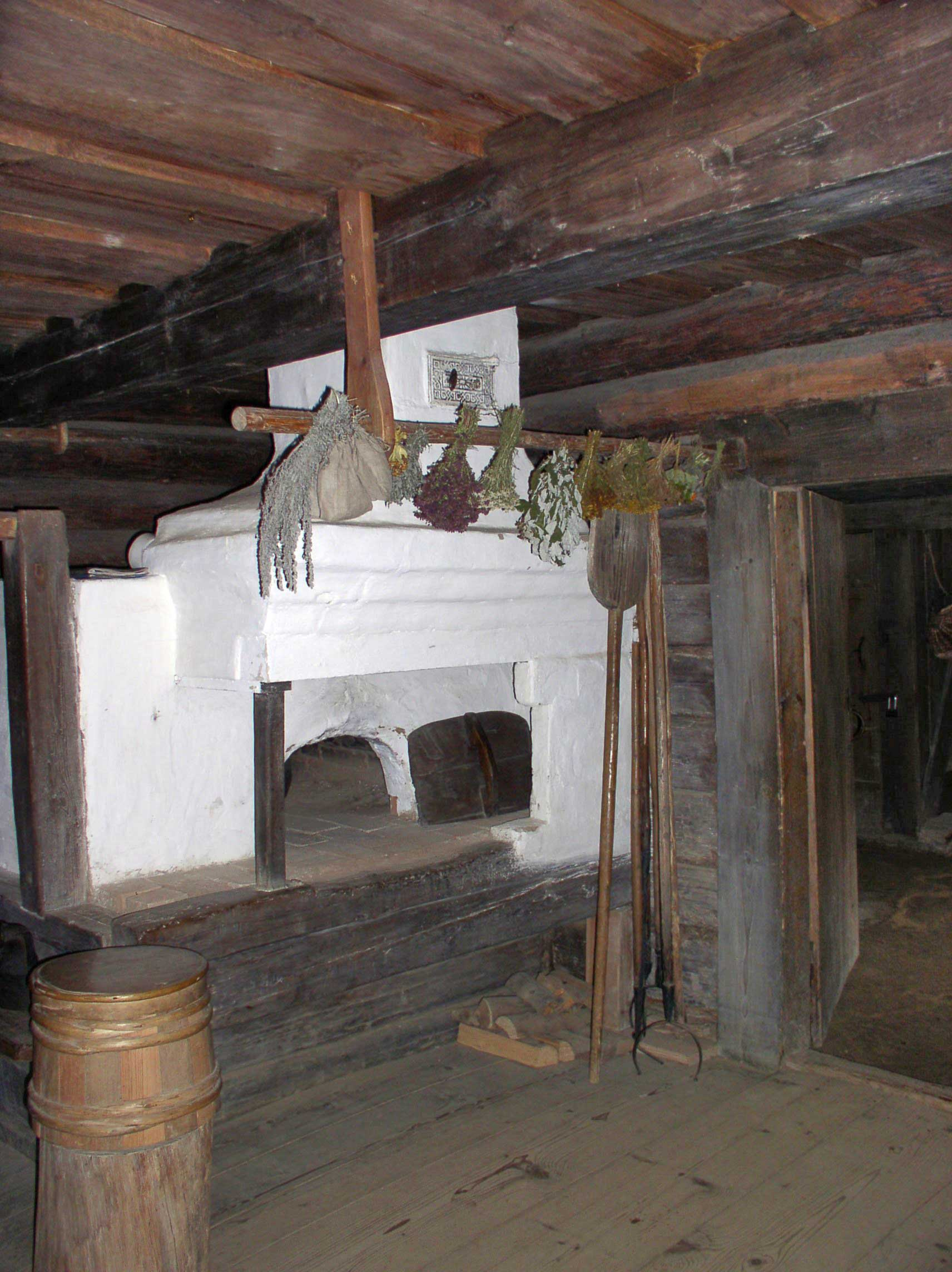
Typical Russian stove in a peasant izba with tools visible to the right of the stove

The Russian stove (Russian: русская печь) is a type of masonry stove that first appeared in the 15th century or earlier. These stoves combine the functions of a traditional stove, oven, and fireplace into a single unit, and serve a broad range of purposes, including cooking (boiling, baking, and smoking), drying plants and mushrooms, providing interior heating and ventilation, bathing, and providing a warm place to sleep (many units include a sleeping berth atop the stove). They can be found in traditional Russian, Ukrainian, Romanian, Slovak, Polish and Belarusian households. Such stoves burn only firewood.

== Design ==
A Russian stove is designed to retain heat for long periods of time. This is achieved by channeling the smoke and hot air produced by combustion through a complex labyrinth of passages, warming the bricks from which the stove is constructed.

A brick flue (Russian: боров) in the attic, sometimes with a chamber for smoking food, is required to slow down the cooling of the stove.

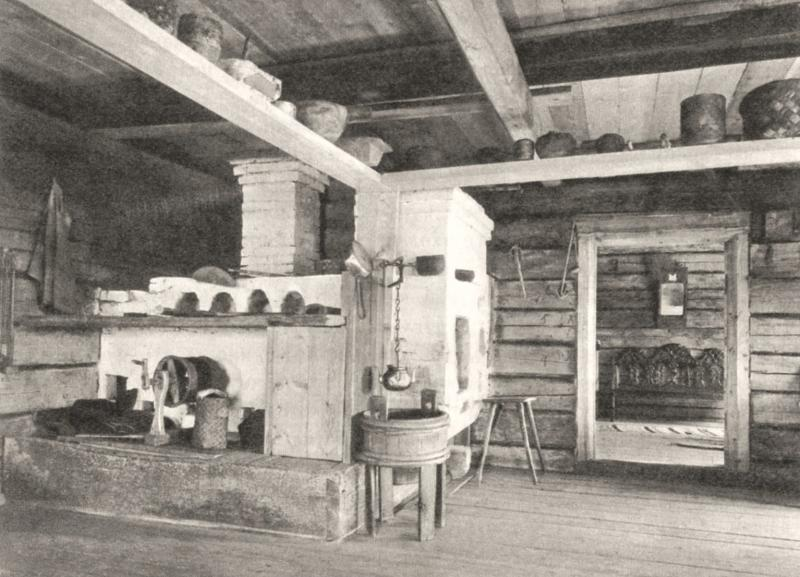
Russian stove in an izba, photographed before 1917

The Russian stove is usually in the centre of the log hut (izba). The builders of Russian stoves are referred to as pechniki, "stovemakers". Good stovemakers always had a high status among the population. A badly built Russian stove may be very difficult to repair, bake unevenly, smoke, or retain heat poorly.

There are many designs for the Russian stove. For example, there is a variant with two hearths (one of the hearths is used mainly for fast cooking, the other mainly for heating in winter). Early Russian culture also made use of a tiled cocklestove.

== Uses ==
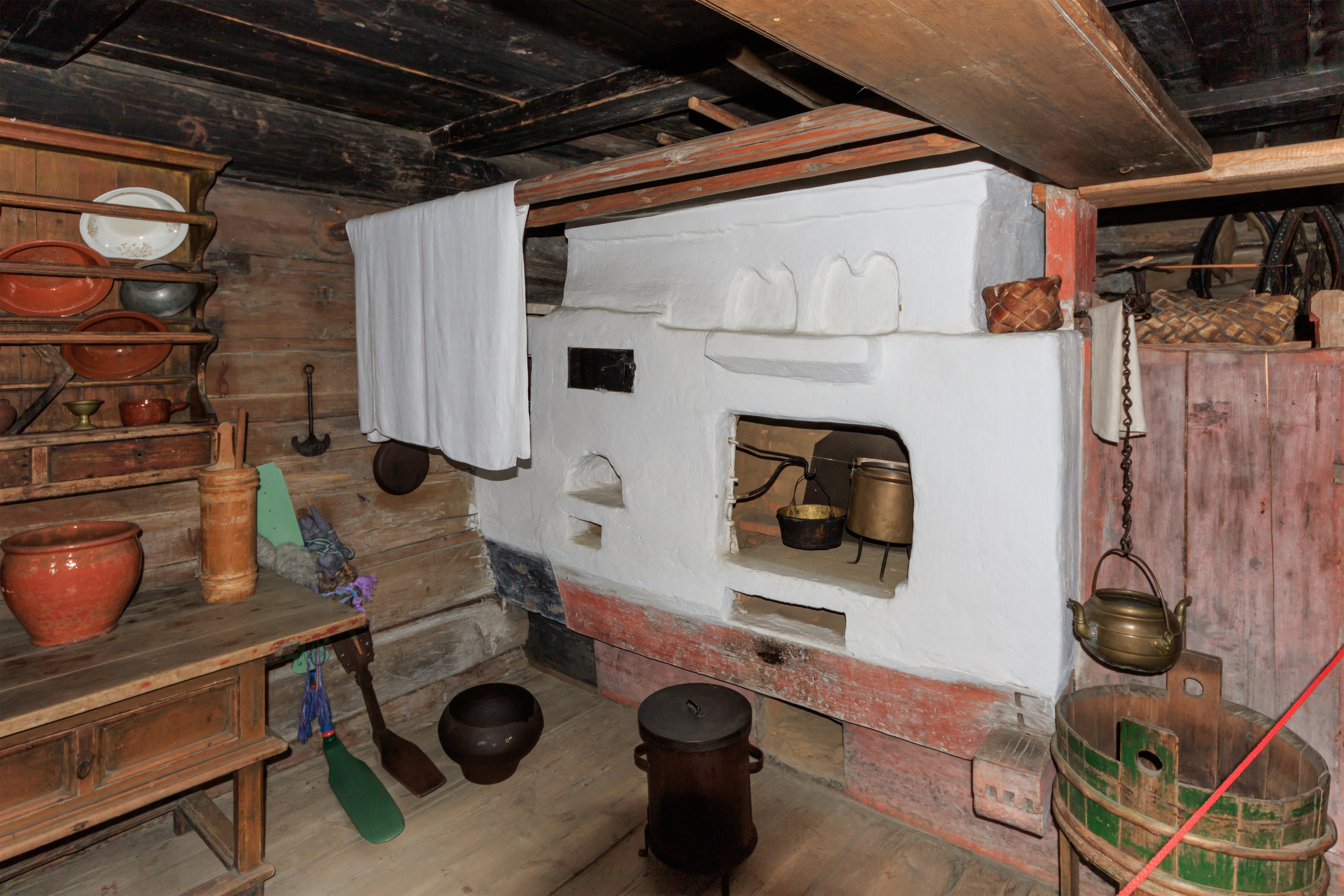
Russian stove in Republic of Karelia, Russia

=== Cooking ===
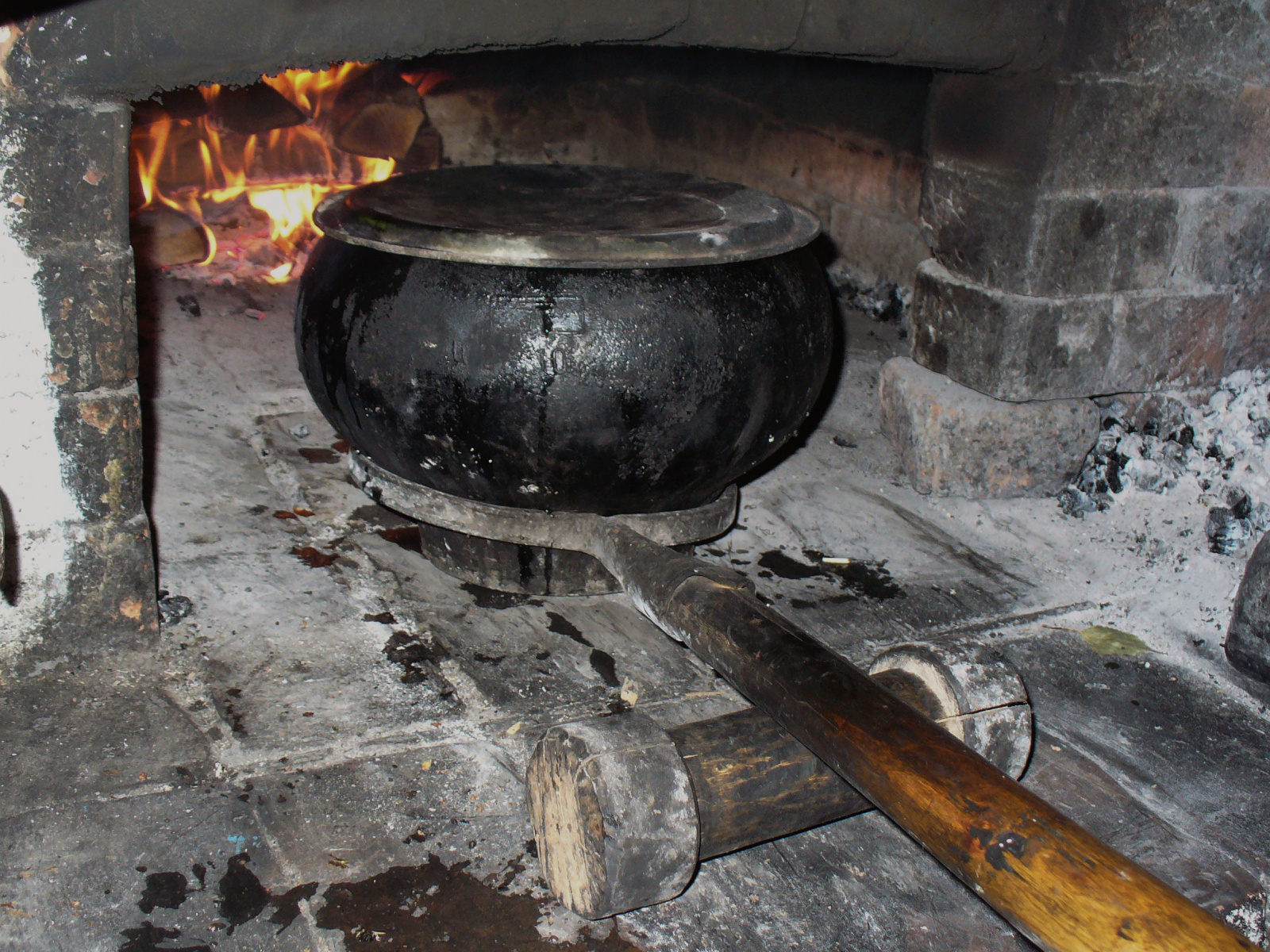
Handling a chugun with an ukhvat

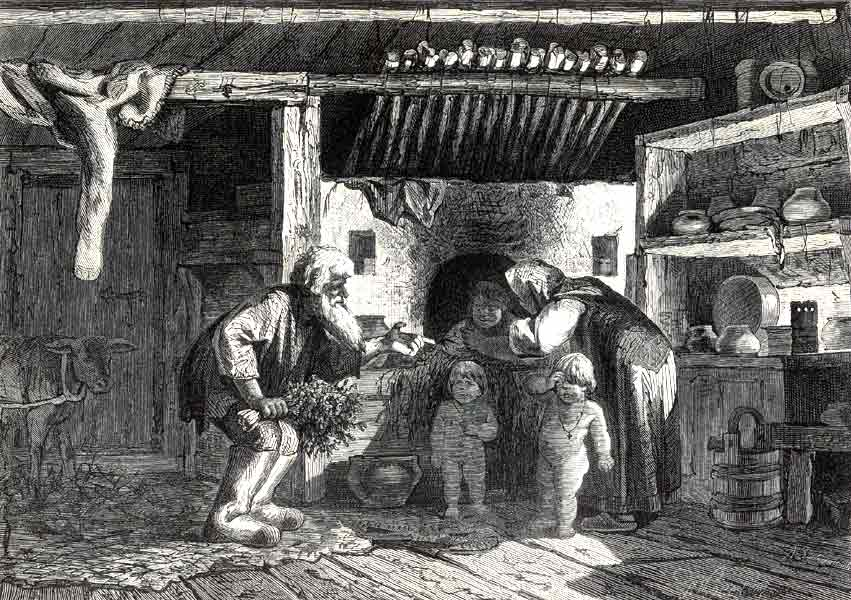
Bathing in a stove

The stove was, and is still used today for cooking and had a strong influence on the taste of Russian cuisine. Dishes where the stove is used are pancakes to bake or pies. The porridge or the pancakes prepared in such a stove may differ in taste from the same meal prepared on a modern stove or range. The process of cooking in the Russian stove can be called "languor" – holding dishes for a long period of time at a steady temperature. Foods that are believed to acquire a distinctive character from being prepared in a Russian stove include baked milk, pastila candies, mushrooms cooked in sour cream, or even a simple potato. Bread is put in and taken out from the stove using a special wooden paddle on a long shank. Cast iron pots of special shape called chugun are handled in the oven with ukhvat, a long wooden handle with the two-pronged metal "grabber".

=== Bathing ===
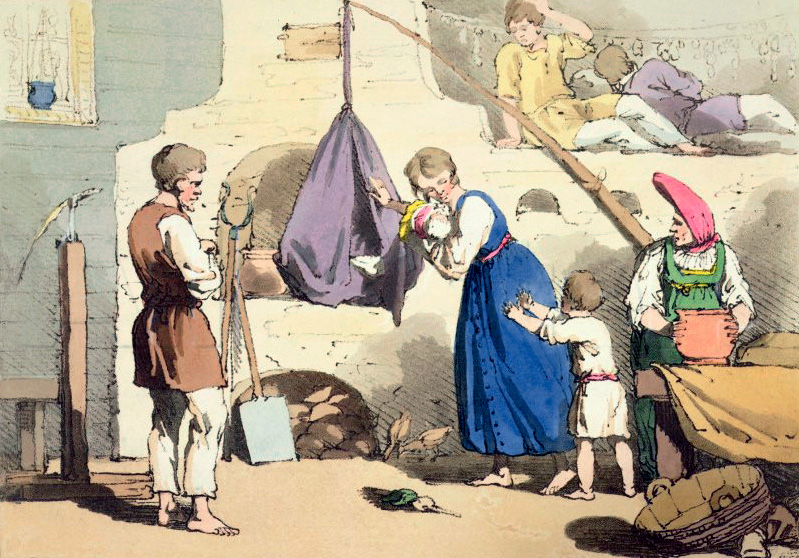
Sleeping atop a Russian stove

As well as warming and cooking, Russian stoves were used for bathing. Once the stove became hot the burning wood was removed, and cast iron containers were put into the stove and filled with water. That allowed people to bathe inside the stove. A grown man can easily fit inside, and during World War II some people escaped the Nazis by hiding in the stoves.

=== Heated sleeping area ===
Besides its use for domestic heating, in winter people may sleep on top of the stove to keep warm: the large thermal mass (a proper Russian stove weighs about two tonnes) and layered design (in many variants the hot flue is separated from the outer brick shell with a layer of sand or pebbles) ensure that the outer surface of the stove is safe to touch. In former times the stove was used to treat winter diseases by warming a sick person inside of it.

== In Russian culture ==
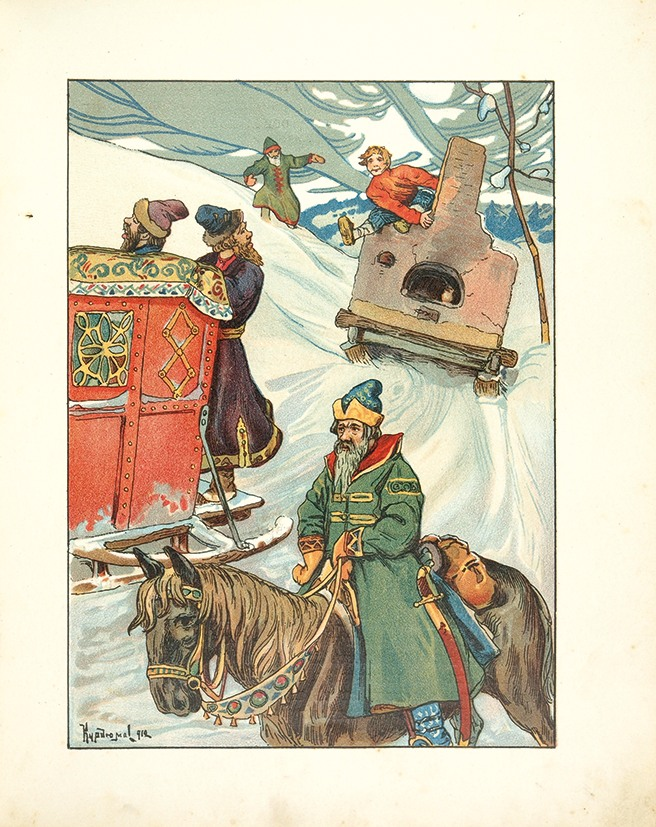
Emelya riding a stove

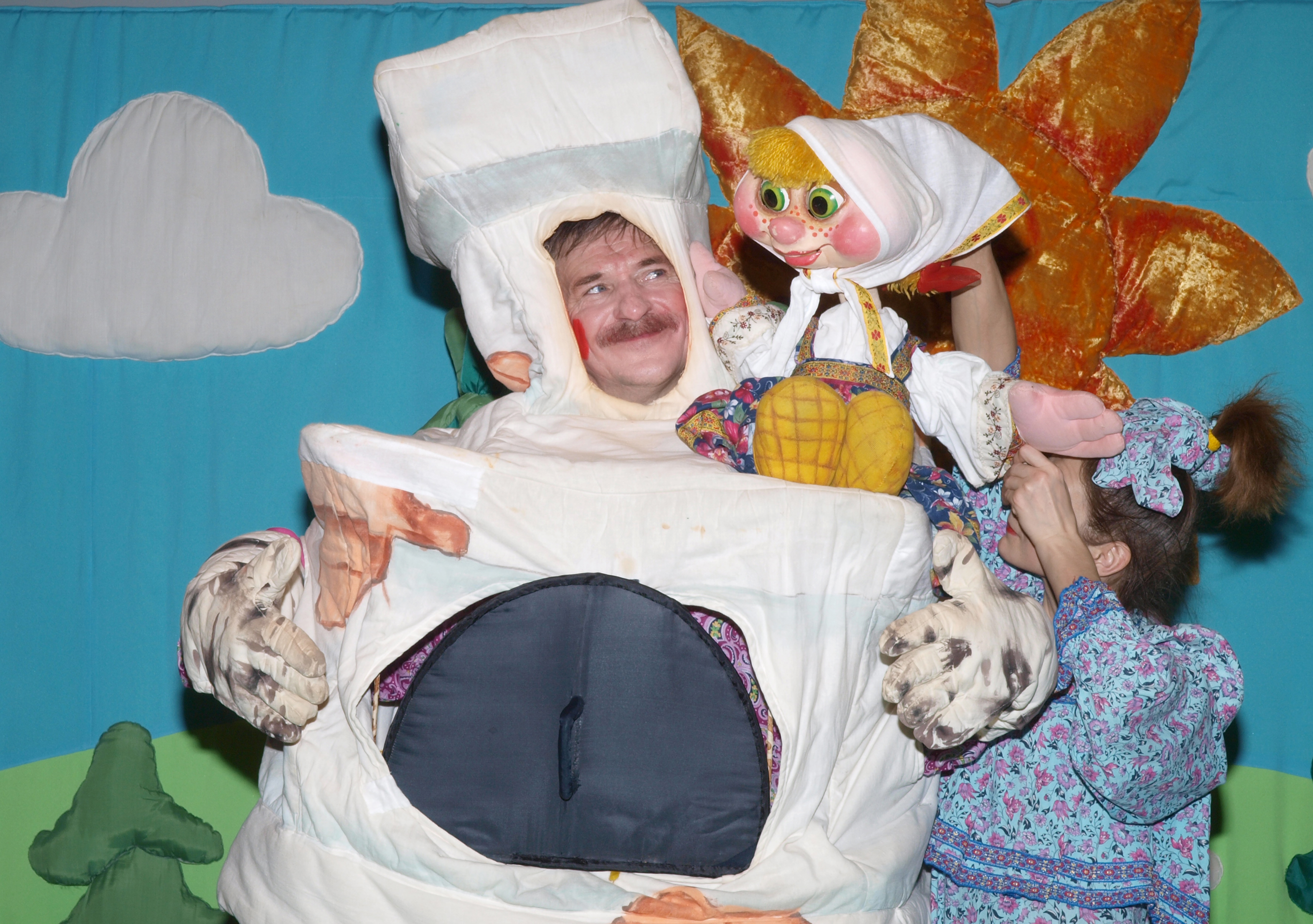
An actor in the role of a stove in a children's play "The Magic Swan Geese"

Because of the harsh winter, the Russian stove was a major element of Russian life and consequently it often appears in folklore, in particular in Russian fairy tales.

Bogatyr Ilya Muromets could only lie on a Russian stove for 33 years, until he was miraculously healed by two pilgrims.

Emelya from "At the Pike's Behest" was so reluctant to leave it that he simply rode on it. Baba Yaga from fairy tales baked lost children in her stove. In fairy tales the stove may receive human characteristics. For example, in "The Magic Swan Geese" a girl meets a Russian stove, and asks it for directions. The stove offers the girl rye buns, and subsequently, on the girl's return, hides her from the swan geese.

== See also ==
- List of cooking appliances
- Hearth
- Brazier
- Wash copper
- Kitchen stove
- Wood-burning stove
- Firebox
- Crucible
- Masonry heater
- Kamado (Japanese)
- Japanese kitchen
- Hibachi
- Kama (Japanese tea ceremony)
- Wok stove
- Agungi/Buttumak (Korean)
