= Ernie and Erica Wisner =

American designers

Ernie and Erica Wisner are a couple from Tonasket, Washington, United States, best known for their innovative rocket mass heater designs. They are often referred to as the worldwide leaders and trainers in rocket stove technology. They have made over 700 rocket stoves all over the world.

== Background ==
The Wisners were introduced to this type of work when Ernie apprenticed with Ianto Evans for two years. Evans, of Cob Cottage Co., was the designer who originally developed this type of technology 30 years ago. Erica and Ernie initially planned to share information about all different types of natural building, but their fans demanded otherwise. People wanted to be taught how to build rocket mass heaters and custom cob rocket stoves.

== Current work ==
Ernie and Erica now spend their time touring the world teaching workshops on how to build these energy-efficient, natural heaters. They are also working to design and build a stove that will get an Underwriters Laboratory listing, which would eliminate insurance issues.

The Wisners helped write the building code for Portland.

In 2013, they were featured in a four-DVD film series produced by Paul Wheaton. The films cover a workshop, and are titled Fire Science, Sneaky Heat, Boom Squish, and Hot Rocket. Village Video produced a film with Ernie and Erica called How To Build Rocket Mass Heaters in which they again teach how to build and maintain these heaters.

In 2015, they were featured in another 4-DVD series about rocket mass heaters, this time covering how to build 10 different styles of rocket mass heaters.

The Wisners have written two books, The Art of Fire and The Rocket Mass Heater Builder's Guide.

In 2017, both were instructors for an Appropriate Technology Course hosted by Paul Wheaton. The course was recorded and is available as a streaming video.

== See also ==
- Permaculture
- Mike Oehler
- Paul Wheaton
- Appropriate Technology
- Rocket mass heater
