= Multifuel =

Engine that supports different kind of fuels

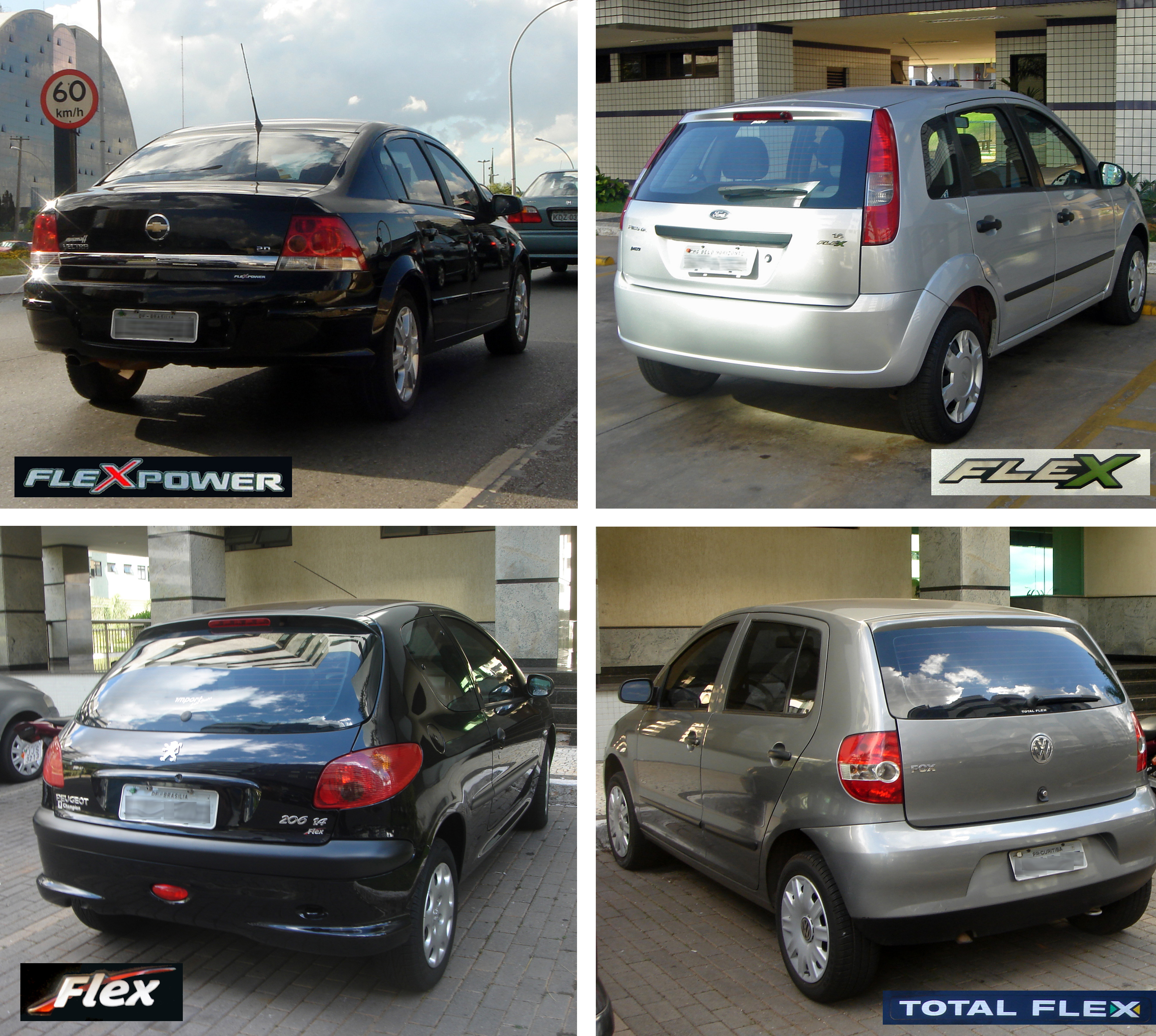
Multifuel automobiles, from several manufacturers, popularly known as "flex" autos, that run on any blend of ethanol and gasoline

Multifuel, sometimes spelled multi-fuel, is any type of engine, boiler, or heater or other fuel-burning device which is designed to burn multiple types of fuels in its operation. One common application of multifuel technology is in military settings, where the normally-used diesel or gas turbine fuel might not be available during combat operations for vehicles or heating units. Multifuel engines and boilers have a long history, but the growing need to establish fuel sources other than petroleum for transportation, heating, and other uses has led to increased development of multifuel technology for non-military use as well, leading to many flexible-fuel vehicle designs in recent decades.

A multifuel engine is constructed so that its compression ratio permits firing the lowest octane fuel of the various accepted alternative fuels. A strengthening of the engine is necessary in order to meet these higher demands. Multifuel engines sometimes have switch settings that are set manually to take different octanes, or types, of fuel.

== Types ==
Multifuel systems can be classified by the fuel-burning appliance it is based on. For internal combustion engines there are:

- Multifuel diesel engines.
- Multifuel gas turbines.
- Flexible-fuel petrol engines. Limited to fuels that can be spark-ignited.

For heaters, see multi-fuel stove.

== Military multifuel engines ==
One common use of this technology is in military vehicles, so that they may run a wide range of alternative fuels such as gasoline or jet fuel. This is seen as desirable in a military setting as enemy action or unit isolation may limit the available fuel supply, and conversely enemy fuel sources, or civilian sources, may become available for usage.

One large use of a military multifuel engine was the LD series used in the US M35 2 1/2-ton and M54 5-ton trucks built between 1963 and 1970. A military standard design using M.A.N. technology, it was able to use different fuels without preparation. Its primary fuel was Diesel #1, #2, or AP, but 70% to 90% of other fuels could be mixed with diesel, depending on how smooth the engine would run. Low octane commercial and aviation gasoline could be used if engine oil was added, jet fuel Jet A, B, JP-4, 5, 7, and 8 could be used, as well as fuel oil #1 and #2. In practice, they only used diesel fuel, their tactical advantage was never needed, and in time they were replaced with commercial diesel engines. Another use of multifuel engines is the American M1 Abrams Main battle tank, which uses a multifuel gas turbine engine.

Currently, a wide range of Russian military vehicles employ multifuel engines, such as the T-72 tank (multifuel diesel) and the T-80 (multifuel gas turbine).

== Non-military usage ==
Many other types of engines and other heat-generating machinery are designed to burn more than one type of fuel. For instance, some heaters and boilers designed for home use can burn wood, pellets, and other fuel sources. These offer fuel flexibility and security, but are more expensive than are standard single fuel engines. Portable stoves are sometimes designed with multifuel functionality, in order to burn whatever fuel is found during an outing. Innovative industrial heaters or burners were the subject of multi-fuel research at a Shell plant in 2014.

The movement to establish alternatives to automobiles running solely on gasoline has greatly increased the number of automobiles available which use multifuel engines, such vehicles generally being termed a bi-fuel vehicle or flexible-fuel vehicle.

Most ocean-going ships are built to burn bunker fuel. Many newer ships have engines that are built to use different fuels, mainly marine diesel oil (mostly ultra-low-sulfur diesel) or liquefied natural gas (in Marine LNG Engines), but also methanol or ammonia.

== Underperformance issues ==
Multifuel engines are not necessarily underpowered, but in practice some engines have had issues with power due to design compromises necessary to burn multiple types of fuel in the same engine. Perhaps the most notorious example from a military perspective is the L60 engine used by the British Chieftain Main Battle Tank, which resulted in a very sluggish performance – in fact, the Mark I Chieftain (used only for training and similar activities) was so underpowered that some were incapable of mounting a tank transporter. An equally serious issue was that changing from one fuel to another often required hours of preparation.

The US LD series had a power output comparable to commercial diesels of the time. It was underpowered for the 5-ton trucks, but that was due the engine size itself; the replacement diesel was much larger and more powerful. The LD engines did burn diesel fuel poorly and were very smokey. The final LDT-465 model received a turbocharger largely to clean up the exhaust, there was little power increase.

== See also ==
- Flexible-fuel vehicle
- Multi-fuel stove
