= Paul Wheaton =

American permaculture author, master gardener, software engineer, and author

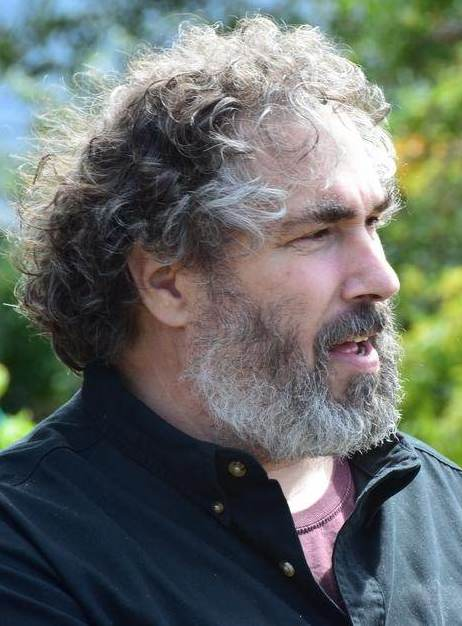
- Wheaton at Seattle, WA in 2015
- Born: Moscow, Idaho, U.S.
- Education: Studied under Sepp Holzer
- Occupations: Permaculture author; producer; software engineer
- Years active: 1995-present
- Known for: Permaculture, Online video
- Website: paulwheaton.com

Paul Wheaton is an American permaculture author, master gardener, software engineer, and disciple of the natural agriculturist Sepp Holzer. He is known for writing his book, "Building a Better World in Your Backyard", founding Permies, the largest website devoted to permaculture, as well as for creating and publishing articles, videos, and podcasts on the subject of permaculture.

Wheaton is also the founder of Coderanch, formerly called Javaranch, an online community for Java programmers. He received three Jolt Awards from Dr. Dobb's Journal for his work related to Javaranch. As a software engineer, he has worked on the ground system for the satellite that took pictures for Google Earth and DigitalGlobe.

Wheaton has participated in several documentaries, TED Talk shows, and conferences, on topics related to permaculture, energy, and software engineering.

== Early life ==
Paul Wheaton was born in Moscow, Idaho, and raised in Eastern Oregon and Missoula, Montana.

He began his career as a software engineer and continued to work for several private companies with software and programming. In the early 1990s, Wheaton developed Bananacom, a terminal emulator, which was used by bulletin board system operators in the United States. At one time, Wheaton had hired 14 programmers from Missoula, Montana to work on the Bananacom project. The product gained popularity among its users due to its usability.

Later in 2000, Wheaton worked on the ground system software for the spacecraft that took pictures for Google Earth and DigitalGlobe.

== Projects ==
=== Permies ===
In 2000, Wheaton shared his views on lawn care on his website richsoil. Later that year, he launched the website Permies, a place for people to discuss lawn care and permaculture. By 2012, Permies had become the largest online community dedicated to permaculture and homesteading. Wheaton first documented on Permies his design of natural homes. Called the Wofati, it is a type of natural earth-sheltered building developed by Mike Oehler and expanded upon by Wheaton. Wheaton coined the acronym, which means Woodland Oehler Freaky-cheap Annualized Thermal Inertia. "Woodland" because it is the optimal location for such a building; "Oehler" after the pioneer, "Freaky-cheap," due to the Fairly-cost effective or frugal materials; and Annualized Thermal Inertia from a book by John Hait called "Passive Annual Heat Storage" which inspired much of the reasoning behind the Wofati design. The site has attracted notable personalities such as Geoff Lawton and Toby Hemenway, rocket mass heater developers Ernie and Erica Wisner, medical herbalist Michael Pilarski, and others who explore a range of eclectic permaculture topics.

=== Coderanch ===
In 1997, Kathy Sierra created javaranch.com, which she transferred to Wheaton In January 2000. In 2009, Javaranch was extended to a new domain coderanch.com with a forum. As of May 2020, Coderanch had more than 3 million posts created by over 332,000 registered members.

=== Other projects ===
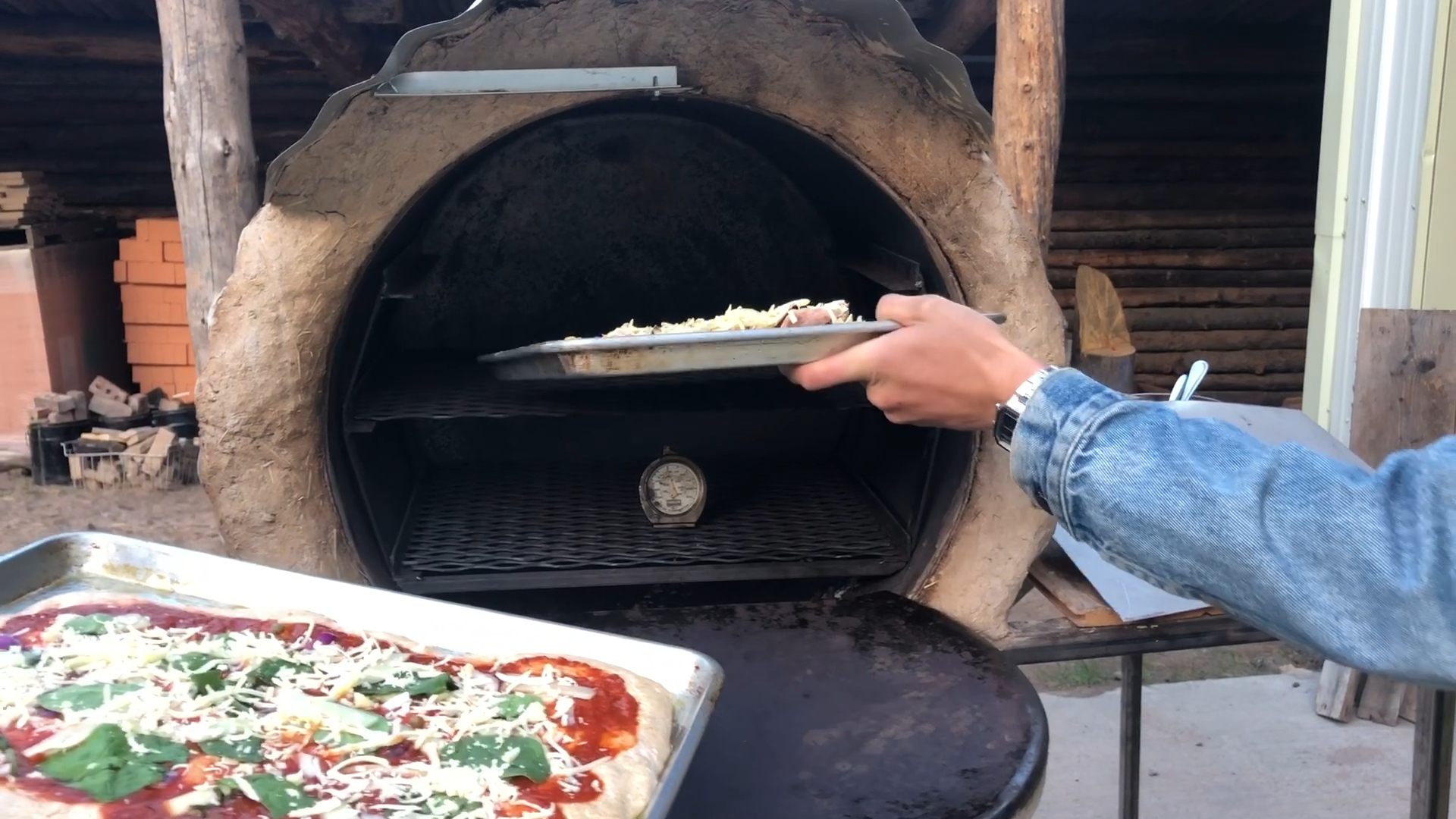
A prototype of an outdoor rocket oven designed by Paul Wheaton being test loaded with pizzas

In 2013, Wheaton produced a documentary of wood-burning stoves, highlighting sustainable ways to heat, which consisted of four segments called "Fire Science", "Sneaky Heat", "Boom Squish", and "Hot Rocket". The documentary was distributed in DVDs, in addition to online streaming and downloadable videos. According to Wheaton, his design of wood burning stoves uses 1/10 of the wood compared to conventional wood burning stoves. He also claimed that his stoves only produce 1/1000 of smoke compared to other stoves.

In 2014, Paul Wheaton crowd-funded and produced a deck of Permaculture Playing Cards, where each card contained information about a different permaculture technique or notable people of permaculture.

Later in the same year, Wheaton produced another documentary titled "World Domination Gardening", which featured a 3 days workshop of Hügelkultur, earthworks, ponds, and swales. The documentary was distributed in sets of three DVDs, called "Sealing a Pond Without a Liner", "Ditches and Swales", and "Hugelkultur and Terracing".

In 2015, Wheaton launched a Kickstarter project to make a documentary of rocket mass heaters. The documentary has been distributed in DVDs, streaming media, downloadable video files, and PDF plans.

In 2017, Wheaton hosted a Permaculture Design Course and an "Appropriate Technology Course" which consisted of a 14 days workshop. The project was able to raise the pledged funds within 22 hours after its Kickstarter project was launched.

Later in 2018, Wheaton produced a documentary called "Rocket Ovens", which he described as an efficient way to cook and bake food making less than 1% of the carbon footprint of that of an electric oven. Distributed in DVDs and streaming videos, the documentary featured environmental friendly ways of cooking, baking, and dehydrating food with lesser amount of wood compared to other forms wood-fired ovens.

== Experiments, demonstrations, and opinions ==
Wheaton set up an experiment to demonstrate how compact fluorescent lamps (CFL bulbs) are not better than incandescent light bulbs. He used a combination of warm clothing, incandescent lights that produce heat as well as light, and various heating devices to keep warm while his 700 square foot house in Montana is set for 40 degrees Fahrenheit all winter. With this demonstration, Wheaton concluded that by heating the person instead of the air, a person can remain comfortable and save hundreds of dollars in energy savings.

Wheaton introduced a lifestyle model called Wheaton Eco Scale in 2010 where he categorized different lifestyles into 10 levels, where level-0 makes the highest carbon footprint and level-10 makes the lowest.

In 2011, Wheaton demonstrated how hand washing a standard sized load of dishes can only use around a gallon of water. This is in contrast to modern, energy-efficient dishwashers using less than 8 liters (2.1 U.S. gal) per load but a significant improvement to the typical water usage during hand-washing of 20–300 liters (5.3–79.3 U.S. gal).

In 2014, Wheaton produced a documentary on mason bees which was featured in TreeHugger. In the documentary, Wheaton compared mason bees with Honey bees and what humans can do to help, which included keeping bees in refrigerators.

Wheaton has performed testing for heating a person rather than a whole house to save 90% on a heating bill while staying warm.

== Publications ==
=== Books ===
- Building a Better World in Your Backyard: Instead of Being Angry at Bad Guys. Oklahoma City: Shawn Klassen-Koop. 2019. ISBN 978-1-9991714-3-8. OCLC 1336242698.
- Wheaton, Paul; Haasl, Mike (2022). SKIP: Skills to Inherit Property. permies.com. ISBN 978-1-7377680-0-5. OCLC 1351088342, 1369654029.

=== Articles ===
- Wheaton, Paul; Bean, Suzy (July 2011). "Ants & aphids on my apple tree!". Countryside & Small Stock Journal. Waterloo, WI: Countryside Publications: 66–68. ISSN 8750-7595. OCLC 1057943477. Republished at "Aphids and Ants on Apple Trees!". Countryside Magazine. August 5, 2021..

=== Podcasts ===
In 2011, Wheaton launched a monthly podcast titled "Paul Wheaton Permaculture Podcast". The podcasts mainly consisted of interviews with notable figures in permaculture and educational discussions on various topics of permaculture. In 2019, his Permaculture Podcast ranked number 2 in Feedspot's “Top 15 Permaculture Audio Podcasts & Radio You Must Subscribe and Listen to in 2019."

Wheaton has also participated in other podcasts such as thesurvivalpodcast.com, in which he discussed various topics including Sepp Holzer, wofati, permaculture profitability, rocket mass heaters, light bulbs, and irrigation, and on The Pagan Homesteader podcast where they discussed Hügelkultur and Wofati. Wheaton has also expressed his positions on energy saving methods in a podcast hosted by Abundant Edge. Wheaton was featured on The Joe Gardener podcast on the basics of hugelkultur.

=== Other media ===
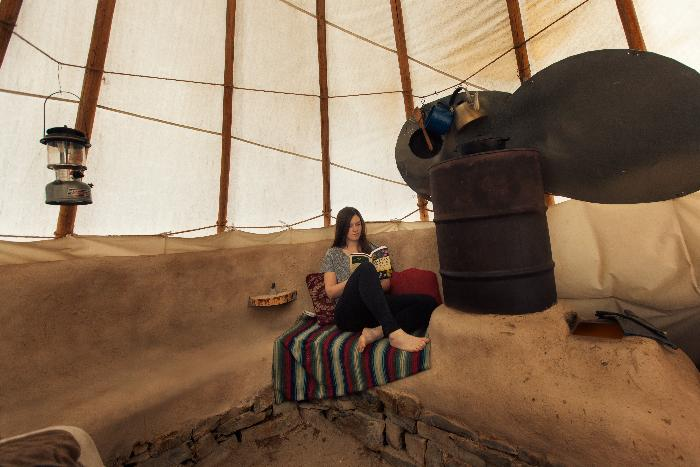
A rocket mass heater inside a tipi at Paul Wheaton's permaculture homestead in Montana

In 2008, Wheaton created his YouTube channel called paulwheaton12. As of November 2025, it had over 420,000 subscribers and 30 million views. In his videos, Wheaton discusses various topics related to permaculture, which includes organic horticulture, rocket mass heaters, natural building, alternative energy, homesteading, frugality, raising chickens, wildcrafting, aquaculture, paddock shift systems, and colony collapse disorder. His videos also include interviews with Sepp Holzer and other notable people in the field of permaculture. He further presented his findings during his TEDTalk, "REALLY Saving Energy: Paul Wheaton at TEDxWhitefish".

=== Interviews ===
In 2019, Peak Prosperity interviewed Wheaton about his book, "Building a Better World in Your Backyard (Instead of Being Angry at Bad Guys).

In 2020, Mike Nowak interviewed Wheaton about Building a Better World in Your Backyard (Instead of Being Angry at Bad Guys) and his general thoughts and beliefs on permaculture.

== See also ==
- Ralph Borsodi – American economist
- Food Not Lawns – Social movement emphasizing organic gardens
- David Holmgren – Australian environmental designer
- Sepp Holzer – Austrian farmer and permaculture teacher
- Hugelkultur – Mounded gardening technique
- Bill Mollison – Australian scientist (1928–2016)
- Natural farming – Sustainable farming approach
- Scott Nearing – American economist, pacifist, and homesteader (1883–1983)
- Mike Oehler – American environmentalist and author
