= Rocket mass heater =

Type of heating system

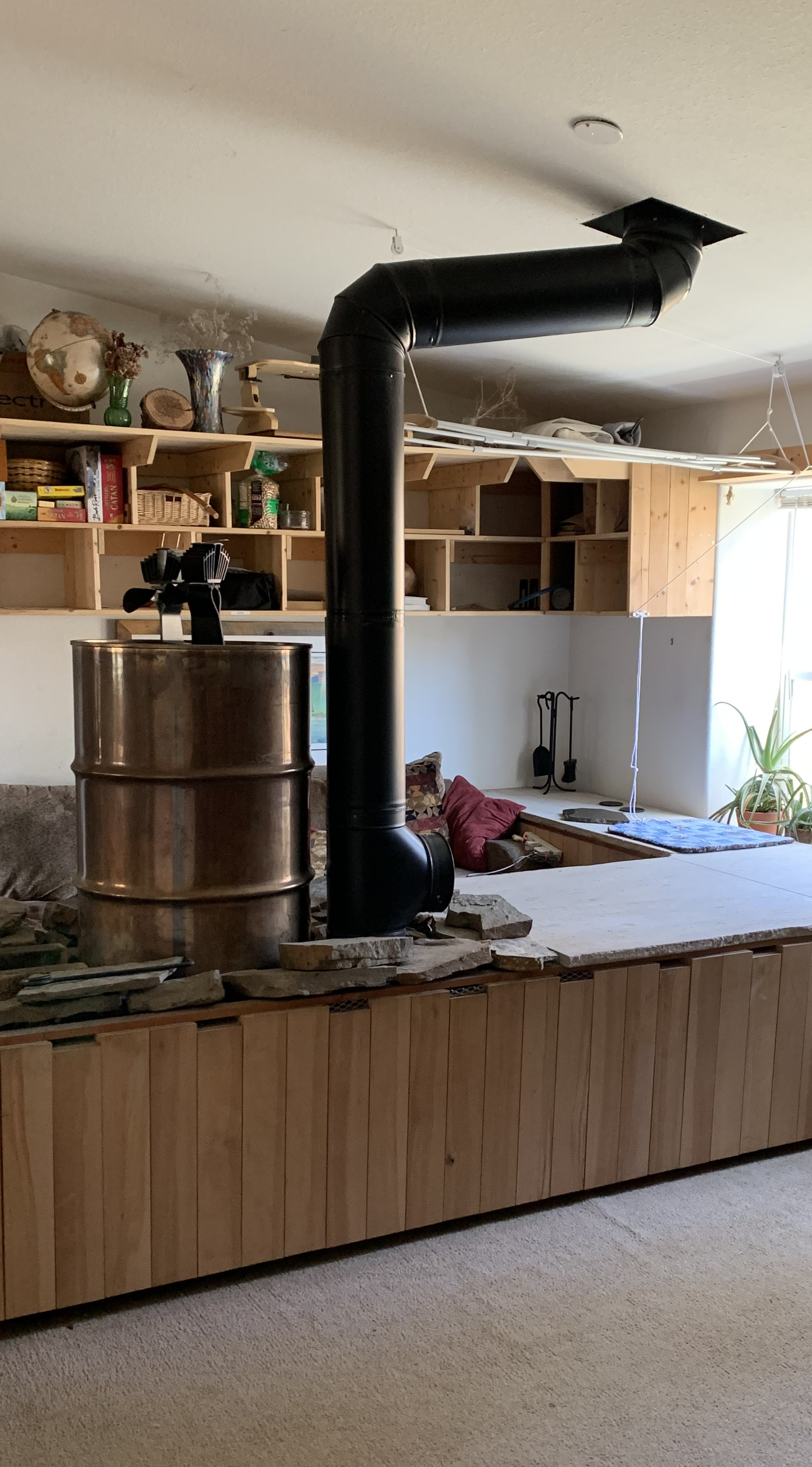
A pebble style rocket mass heater installed at a home in Montana

A rocket mass heater (RMH), also known as a rocket stove mass heater, is a form of slow-release radiant heating system, designed to primarily heat people and secondarily to warm areas in line of sight around it. Variations of RMH can also be extended for the functions of cooking, heating water, and producing warm air for distribution.

Rocket mass heaters are developed from rocket stoves, a type of wood-burning stove, and masonry heaters. A primary design of a rocket mass heater consists of an insulated combustion chamber where fuel is burned with high efficiency at high temperature, and a large thermal mass in contact with the exhaust gases, which absorbs most of the generated heat before the gases are released to the atmosphere. According to anecdotes a rocket mass heater might reduce fuel consumption by 80–90% compared to conventional stoves.

In contrast to conventional wood-burning stoves and fireplaces, in a rocket mass heater, combustion is close to complete. In a rocket mass heater, by-products of combustion, such as smoke, soot, and creosote compounds, are sucked into the insulated tunnel of the unit, where some claim they further combust, releasing even more heat energy to drive the rocket process, unlike a normal fire, where they are blown out the chimney.

== History ==
The word rocket was adopted from the rocket stove developed by Aprovecho for cooking, described in 1982. Mass refers to the mass of masonry where it stores heat. Masonry heaters have been used since pre-historic times and have evolved into various designs in Europe, Russia, and China. The key principle is the incorporation of a large thermal mass built of masonry which absorbs heat from exhausting combustion products directed in a sinuous path through channels embedded in the masonry.

Construction of the base of a rocket stove, L-tube type, time lapse

Rocket stove of the L-tube type

The first prototype was built in the 1980s. Although in some sense simply a variation on a masonry heater, most rocket mass heaters are distinct in producing immediate radiant heat (from the metal burn barrel), in being constructed of much cheaper materials (usually a cob mass, 55 gallon steel drum, and small brick firebox), and in requiring less robust a base to be constructed on, since a rocket mass heater's weight is distributed over a larger area.

== Different types of rocket mass heaters ==
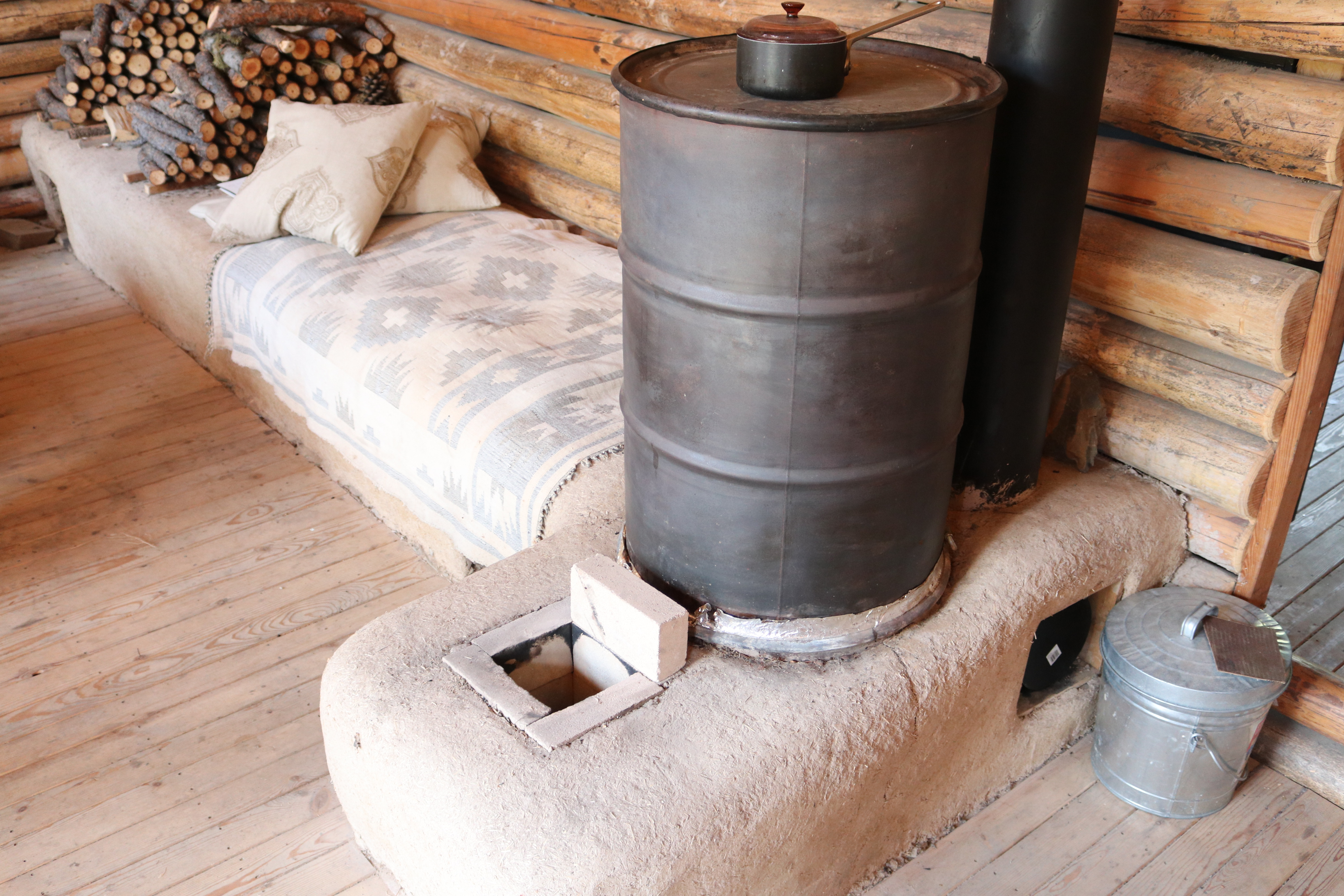
A cob-style rocket mass heater, with a heat exchange mass made with cob

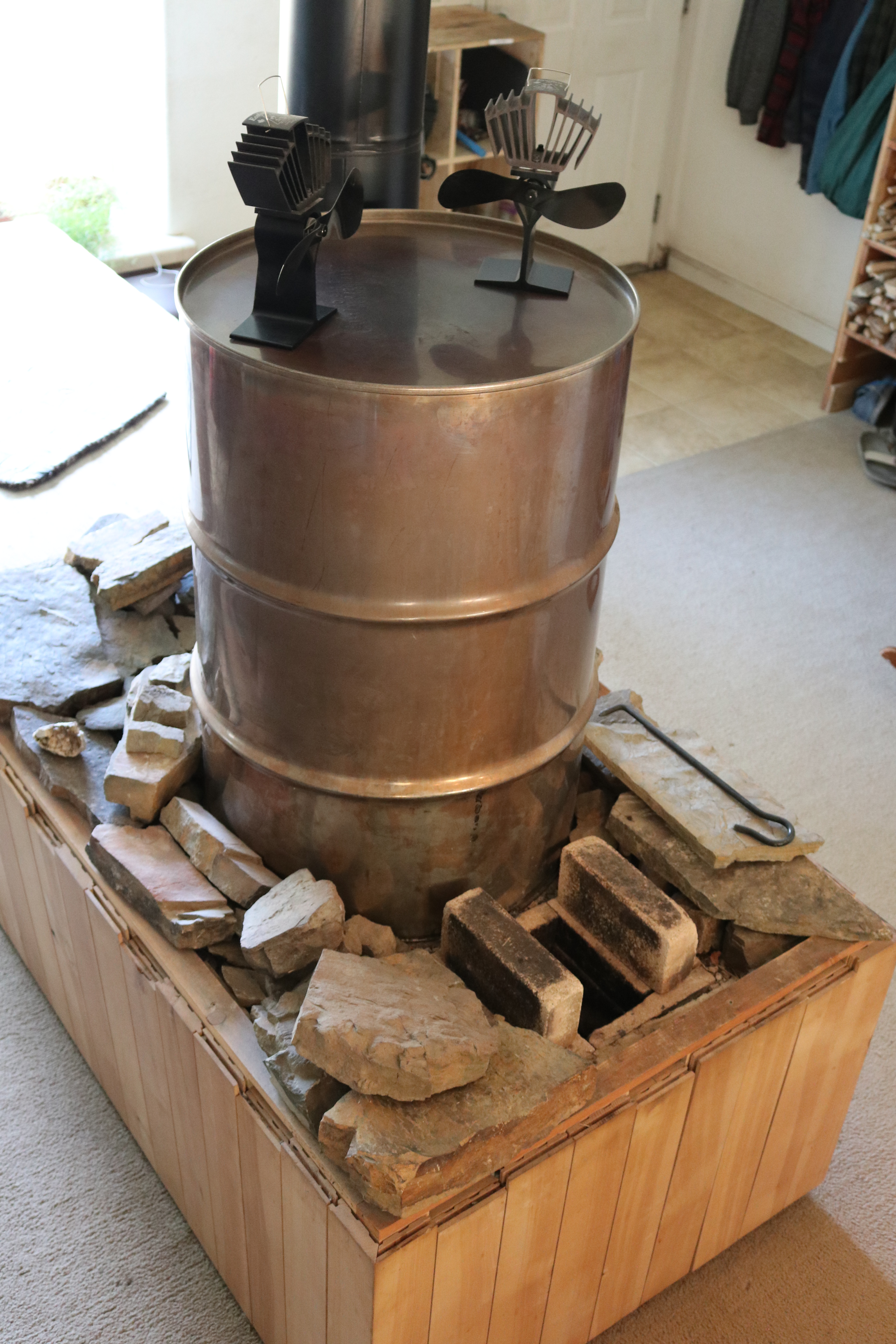
A pebble-style rocket mass heater, with a wooden frame which gives it a different aesthetic

There are several types of rocket mass heaters depending on how they are designed. In all designs, an internal insulated chimney called a "heat riser", produces an efficient high-temperature burn creating sufficient draft to push exhaust gases through the rest of the system. Flue gases are cooled to a relatively low temperature within the thermal store, approximately at 50 °C (122 °F). In some designs, steam within these gases condenses into liquid, releasing the associated latent heat of condensation which further increases the efficiency in the manner of a condensing (gas) boiler.

=== J-tube style ===
In the earliest and most popular form, wood is gravity-fed into a J-shaped combustion tube, from where the hot gases enter a well-insulated firebrick or ceramic refractory vertical secondary combustion chamber, the exhaust from which then passes along horizontal metal ducting embedded within a massive thermal store. The thermal store is large enough to retain heat for many hours and may form part of the structure of the building. They can be used with natural buildings and within permaculture designs; where they are normally self-built and are recognized by many (but not all) building codes which regulate the design and construction of heating systems within buildings.

=== Batch-box style ===
More recent alternate developments have instituted a batch-fed horizontal firebox called a batch box, which feeds into the vertical heat riser or secondary combustion chamber. Compared to a conventional J-tube style RMH, a batch-box style RMH can be loaded with more wood at once so that it can run by itself for a longer period of time. The horizontal duct flow through the mass may be replaced by a heavy "bell" of larger cross section where the hot gases slow and stratify, where the cooled gases exit near the bottom as in some masonry heaters. To allow proper airflow, the vertical port at the back of the box should never be blocked. Compared to J-tube style RMH, it can take more time to build a batch-box style RMH.

=== Cob style ===
The heat riser of a cob style rocket mass heater is made of cob which does not contain straw. This “fire cob” is essentially unbaked terra cotta and holds has a similar heat capacity to fired red clay brick. An exterior coating of regular cob plaster provides a tougher, more wear-resistant surface. Regular cob is not used for the mass storage because the straw would lower the thermal conductivity and heat capacity of the mass. Because of the relatively low thermal conductivity, a mass consisting of cob can absorb heat and retain it for a longer period.

=== Pebble style ===
Invented by Paul Wheaton in 2010, a pebble-style rocket mass heater uses pebbles and rocks to facilitate its thermal mass. Compared to cob style rocket mass heaters, pebble style heaters weigh less, allowing them to be moved and modified easily. The lightweight design also makes them more suitable for installing in places that have wood floor. A pebble core also provides a different aesthetic look compared to cob.

== Components ==
J-style combustion unit of a rocket mass heater, profile view (top) and top-down view (bottom). 1: Fuel feed. 2: Burn tunnel. 3: Heat riser. 5: Fire box (comprising the fuel feed, burn tunnel and heat riser). 4 and 6: Downdraft bell / barrel. 7: Manifold.

Different types of rocket mass heaters are made with different components and different materials for specific purposes. All types of rocket mass heaters have three main components: a wood feed, a heat riser and a heat exchange mass. Depending on the design, a rocket mass heater can have different architecture within these components, and may also contain several other components designed for different purposes.

=== Wood feed ===
The wood feed is the opening through which wood and air enter the system. In a J-tube design, the wood feed is a small and narrow opening that receives wood in a vertical orientation. A wood feed is designed in a way that when wood sticks are inserted into the feed, only the bottom end of the sticks burn. Due to the direction of the airflow, the fire burns sideways, toward the combustion chamber and the heat riser. The horizontal direction of the fire prevents smoke from escaping the wood feed to the environment. As the bottom of the wood sticks burn, they get slowly pushed in to the feed. The wood feed in a batch-box style rocket mass heater allows more wood to be loaded at the same time.

=== Heat riser ===
The heat riser is an insulated, vertical channel that draws flames upward and powers the rest of the firebox. The heat riser should be insulated to help hold the flames at high temperatures for a complete combustion. The low thermal conductivity of the insulation material allows temperature to build up within the heat riser to high temperatures. When the hot gases reach the enclosing barrel, it gives off a significantly higher amount of heat, which cools the hot air to a relatively lower temperature. This flow causes a strong convective current within the heat riser, which creates a forward airflow which helps wood to burn sideways in the wood feed.

=== Barrel ===
The barrel, which encloses the heat riser, is typically of 0.2 m^{3}. It serves as a radiation heat source for the space, and the top can serve as a cooking surface. To allow efficient convective currents, the barrel should be made of steel or materials with higher thermal conductivity.

=== Heat exchange mass ===
The thermal mass which encloses the exhaust duct and absorbs heat from the hot combustion gases is the interface that radiates heat to the environment. It can be made of cob, rocks, sand, or pebbles. The thermal mass is often sculpted into a bench which can become an architectural feature of the home.

== Operation ==
J-tube rocket mass heater in operation. 1. Vertically inserted wood burns sideways. 2. High temperature creates strong convective currents in the heat riser. 3. Exhaust gas exits sideways. 4. Heat exchange mass absorbs, stores, and radiates energy. 5. Final exhaust, mainly carbon dioxide and steam).

A rocket mass heater is powered by the heat of combustion of wood inserted into the wood feed in vertical orientation. To start the combustion process, the bottom end of the bundle of wood should be set on fire. The fire can only burn sideways toward the direction of the heat riser, since the insulated tube which connects the wood feed to the heat riser is the only available path for the flow of air.

When fire reaches the heat riser, the J-tube design diverts flames upwards into the highly insulated combustion chamber, which allows heat energy to accumulate and create high-temperature gases. The higher temperature also allows complete combustion of wood fuel. When the hot air comes in contact with the enclosing barrel, the high thermal conductivity of the barrel draws a significant amount of heat from the gas. Because the barrel has a high rate of heat loss, it quickly warms the room.

The remaining exhaust gases, which mainly consist of carbon dioxide and steam, exit sideways through a serpentine duct through the heat exchange mass, giving up much of their heat in the process. The heat exchange mass stores that energy and slowly radiates it to the surrounding environment.

== Benefits ==
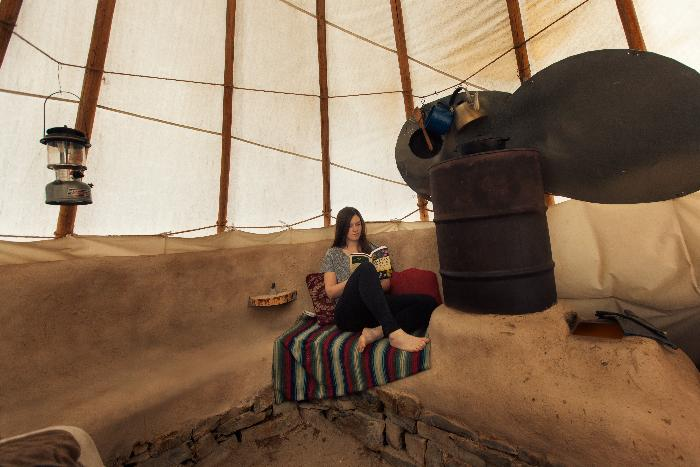
A rocket mass heater inside a tipi at Paul Wheaton's permaculture homestead in Montana

- Some people claim it consumes 10% of wood compared to a conventional wood stove. As the heat exchange mass absorbs and delivers most of the heat of combustion to the surrounding environment, it also provides a higher thermal efficiency. As a result, the exhaust temperature of a functioning rocket mass heater can average around 60–90 °C (140–190 °F), which is lower than that of a conventional wood stove, which averages around 400–600 °C (800–1,100 °F).
- Proponents claim the exhaust gas mostly consists of carbon dioxide and steam, because a rocket stove in general is more efficient at burning fuel.
- The low thermal transmittance of the heat exchange mass allows slow release of heat after the fire is out. Some people claim their rocket mass heaters are capable of sufficiently heating their home for several days after all the wood is exhausted and the fire is out.

== Disadvantages ==
- A rocket mass heater can be a massive construction that can take up much of the room in a small house.

== See also ==
- Masonry heater
- Appropriate technology
- Ernie and Erica Wisner
- Paul Wheaton
- Ianto Evans
