= Wood-burning stove =

Type of stove

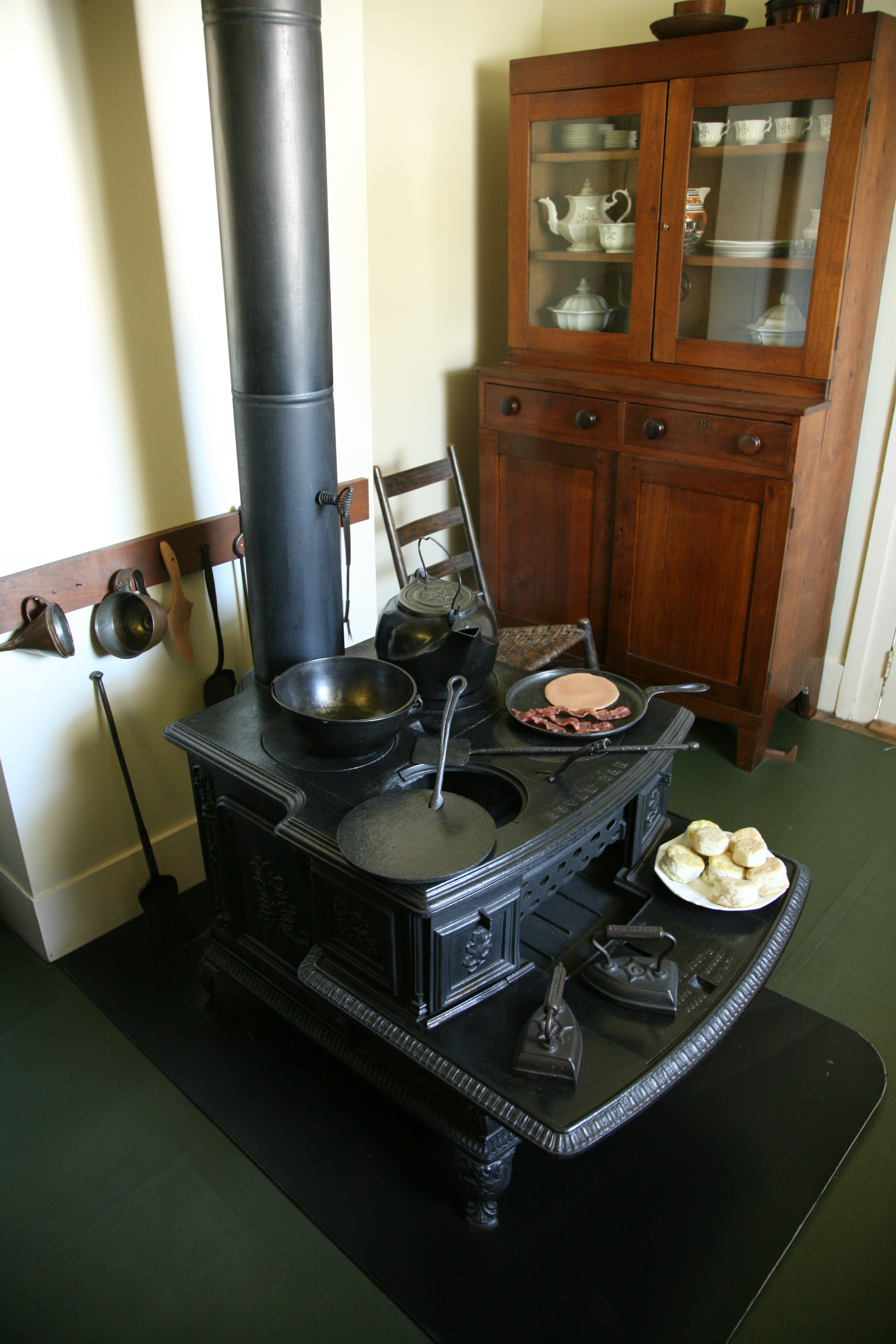
A 19th-century example of a wood-burning stove

A wood-burning stove (or wood burner or log burner in the UK) is a heating or cooking appliance capable of burning wood fuel, often called solid fuel, and wood-derived biomass fuel, such as sawdust bricks. Generally the appliance consists of a solid metal (usually cast iron or steel) closed firebox, often lined by fire brick, and one or more air controls (which can be manually or automatically operated depending upon the stove). The first wood-burning stove was patented in Strasbourg in 1557. This was two centuries before the Industrial Revolution, so iron was still prohibitively expensive. The first wood-burning stoves were high-end consumer items and only gradually became used widely. (Note: This contradicts a claim made in the American History Channel Network's show 101 Inventions That Changed the World, re-broadcast on 30 August 2016, which credited Ben Franklin as the inventor of the wood stove, ignoring the German origin. Franklin did patent an improved stove ca. 1744, including several variants such as a front of fireplace heating unit of cast iron, but his stove was based on existing stoves of German origin (i.e. amongst the many Pennsylvania Dutch) found in the Province of Pennsylvania.)

The stove is connected by ventilating stove pipe to a suitable flue, which will fill with hot combustion gases once the fuel is ignited. The chimney or flue gases must be hotter than the outside temperature to ensure combustion gases are drawn out of the fire chamber and up the chimney.

== Operation ==
=== Air supply ===
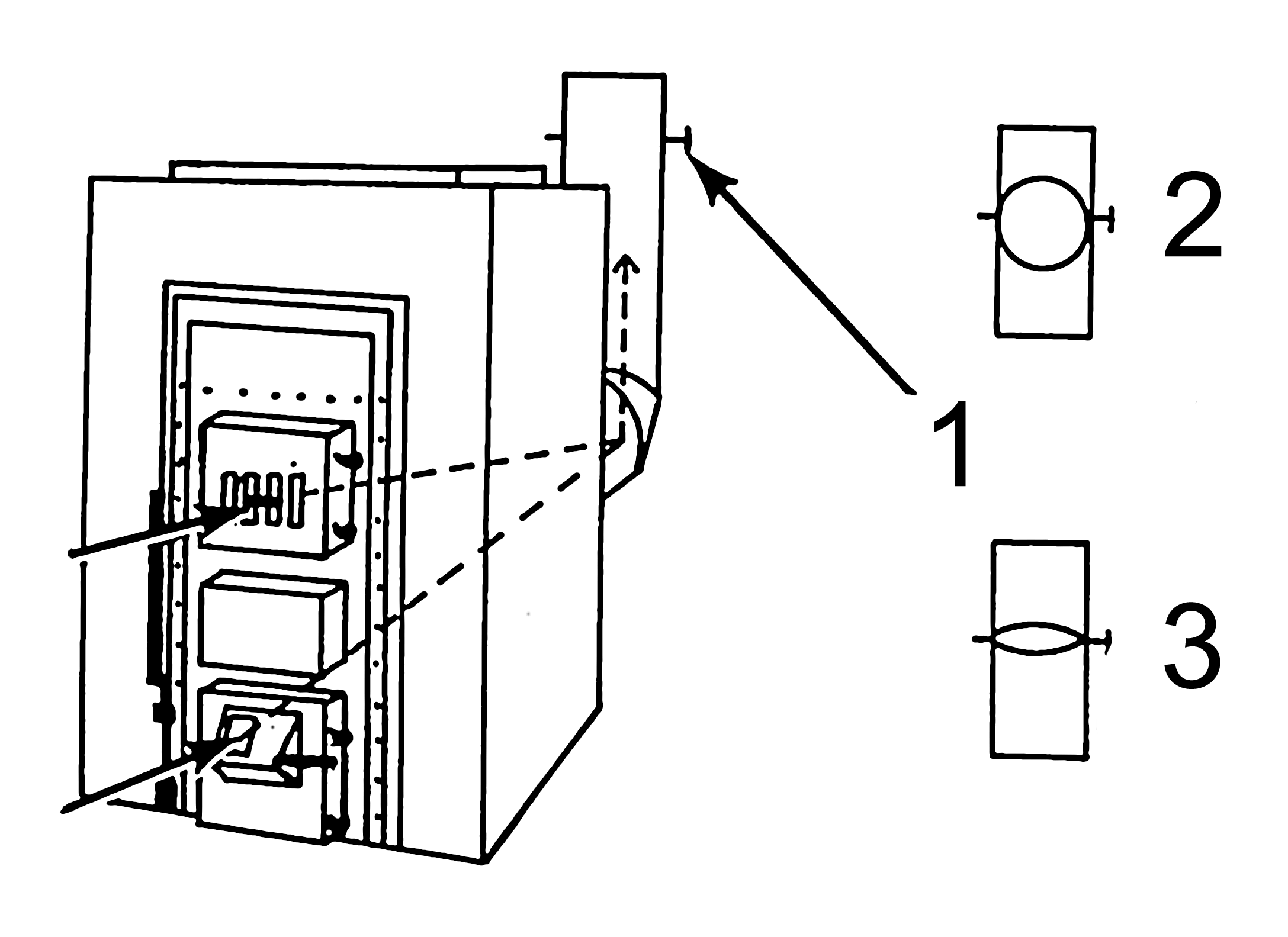
A damper in a stove chimney flue (1) controls air supply by being set open (2) or closed (3).

Keeping the air flowing correctly through a wood-burning stove is essential for safe and efficient operation of the stove. Fresh air needs to enter the firebox to provide oxygen for the fire; as the fire burns, the smoke must be allowed to rise through the stove pipe, creating negative pressure in the firebox, and exit through the chimney. To regulate air flow, there may be damper devices built into the stove, flue, and stove pipes, and there is usually an air intake adjustment to regulate combustion.

By opening or closing the dampers, air flow can be increased or decreased, which can fan the fire in the firebox, or "dampen" it by restricting airflow and reducing the flames. The dampers can usually be accessed by turning knobs or handles attached to the damper. Some stoves adjust their own airflow using mechanical or electronic thermostatic devices.

The highest heating efficiencies on closed appliances can be attained by controlling the various supplies of air to the stove (operating the air controls correctly). On modern stoves, owner's manuals provide documented procedures. Fully open air controls may lead to more heat being sent straight up the chimney rather than into the room (which reduces efficiency). The biggest problem with leaving the air controls fully open on many stoves is “overfiring”. Overfiring is caused when too much heat is generated within the fire chamber, which will lead to warping, buckling and general damage to the stove and its internal components. Different stoves have different numbers and types of air controls. More efficient models have been developed in recent years, employing catalytic combustors to burn remaining particles and gasses within the smoke before it exits the flue, resulting in more heat output, longer burn times and less harmful effect on the environment.

Modern building techniques have created more airtight homes, forcing many stove manufacturers to design their stoves to permit outside air intakes. Outside air can improve the overall efficiency of the stove as a heater by drawing cold combustion air directly from the outside instead of drawing preheated air from the room that the stove is in. Many modern stoves can optionally use an outside air intake. Many manufacturers supply the necessary parts in kit form (an Outside Air Kit, or OAK). When considering an outside air kit, it is important to know that the air must come in from below the level of the stove. For example, a basement stove may not safely use an outside air kit. This is to prevent a reversal of venting in which very hot flue gasses are exhausted through a (usually PVC) air intake pipe, which could lead to a structure fire and/or hot flue gasses being released into the structure.

== Fuel ==
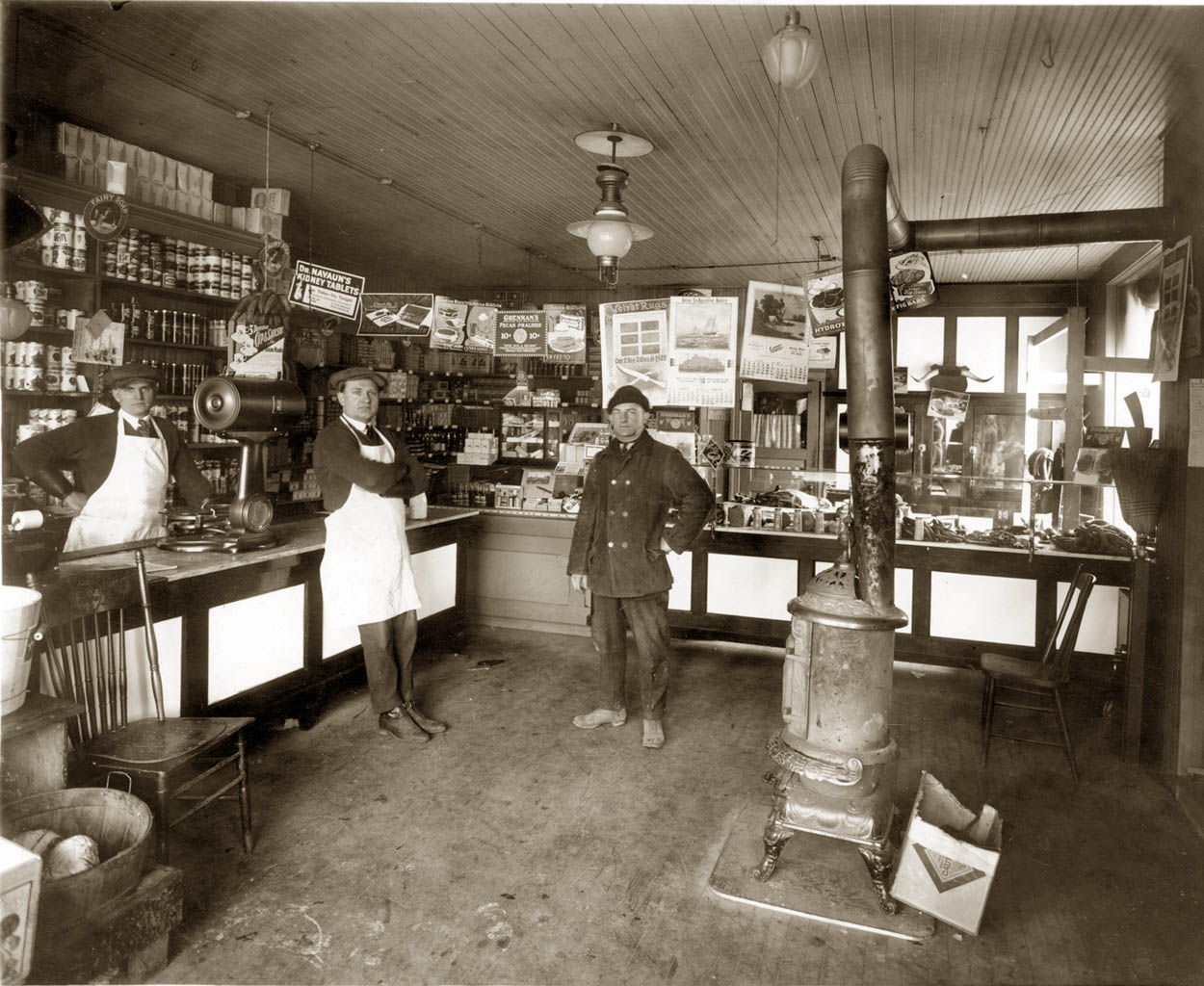
Wood-burning stove heating a grocery store in Detroit (1922)

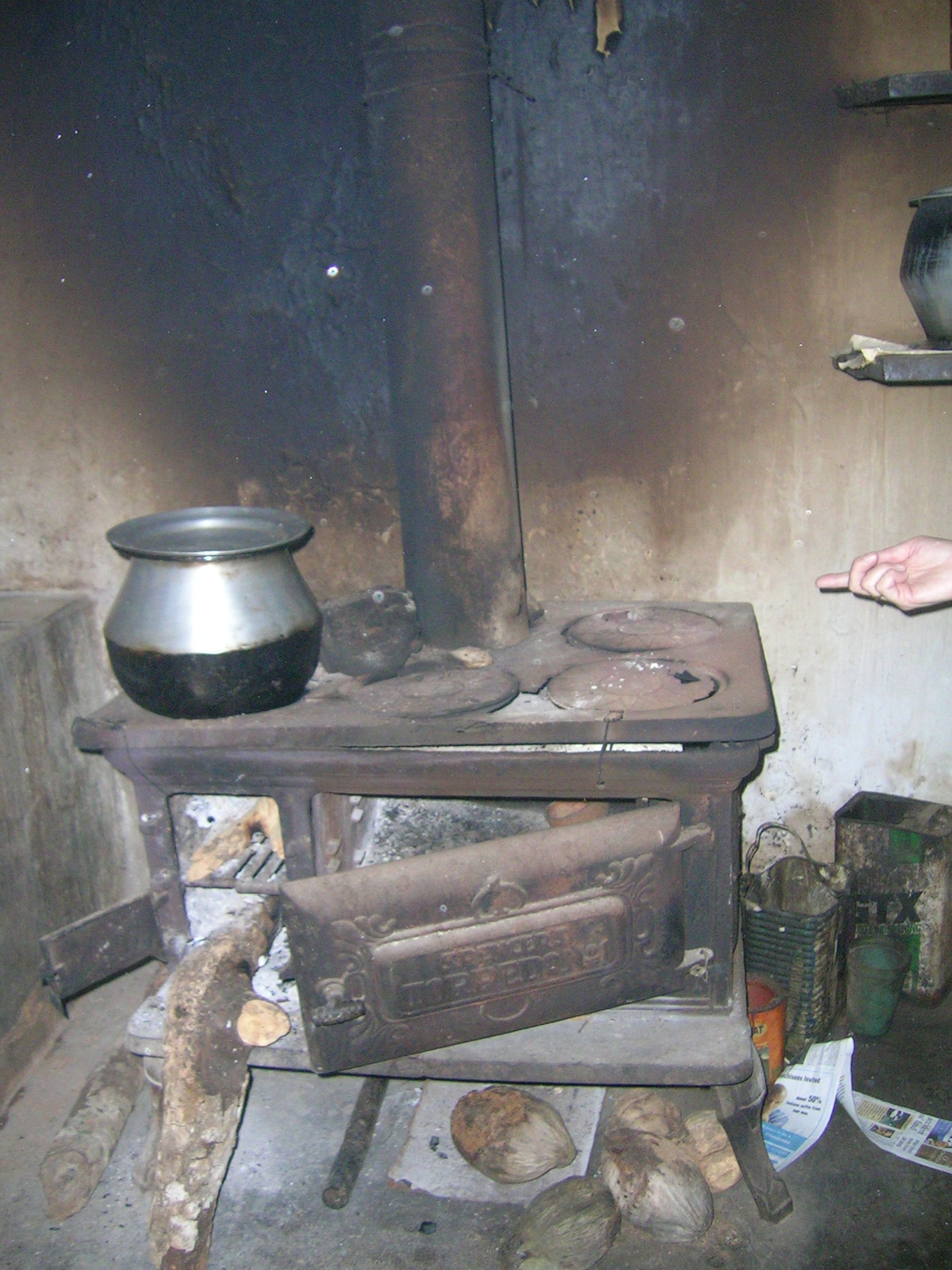
Spencer woodstove in British bungalow at Pollibetta, India

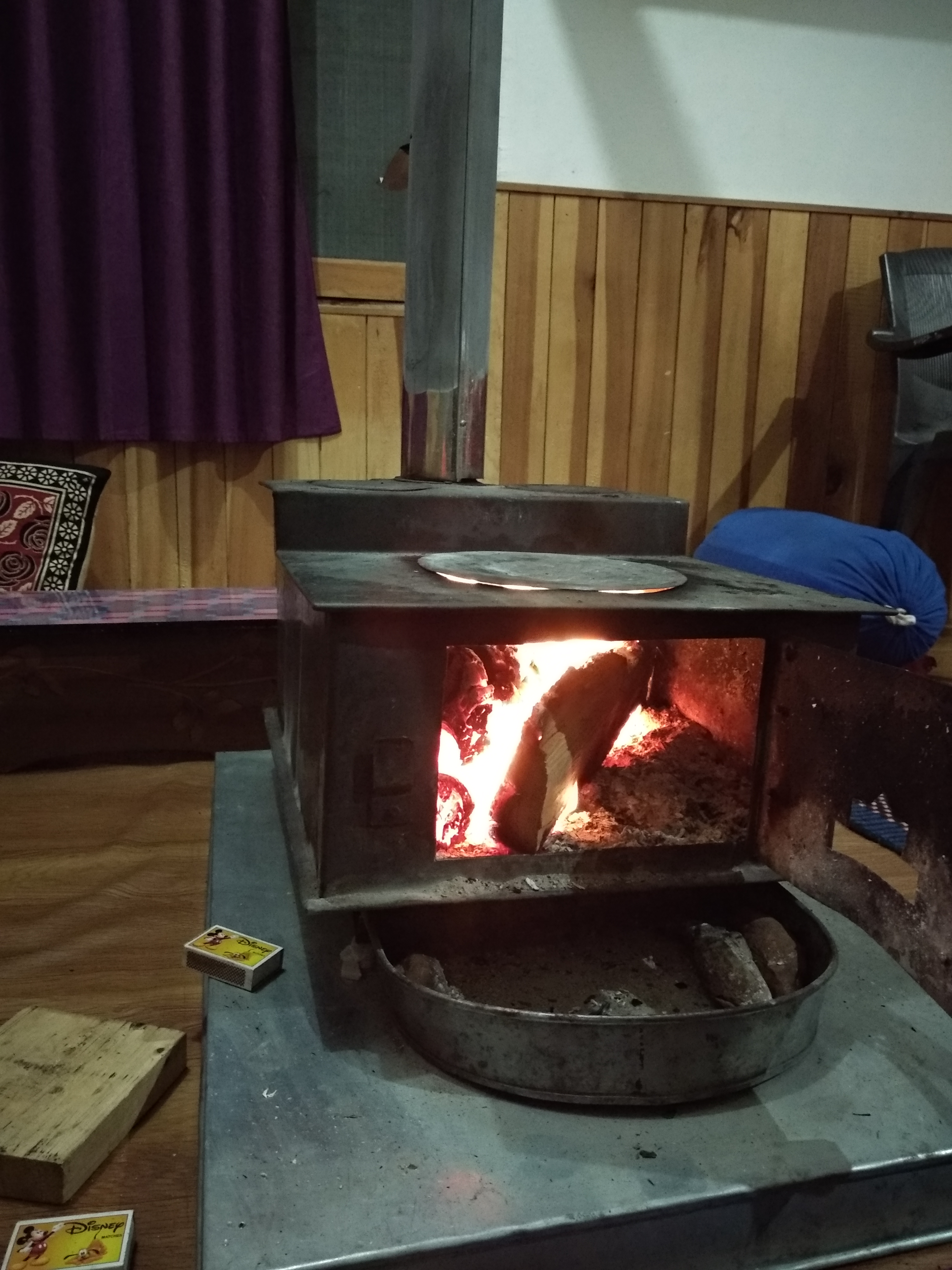
Traditional Himalayan Tandoor

=== Hardwood or softwood ===
Firewood is usually measured and traded by volume or mass. In English-speaking countries not fully metric it is often measured in cords. A face cord is 4' x 8' x the length of the log (usually 16 to 18 inches). A full cord is 4'x4'x8'. When purchasing, cutting, or collecting firewood, it is good to be aware of the difference between hardwood and softwood. Both hardwood and softwood have similar energy contents by mass, but not by volume. In other words, a piece of hardwood would usually be heavier and have more available energy than the same sized piece of softwood. Hardwoods, derived from trees such as oak and ash, may burn at a slower rate, resulting in sustained output. Many softwoods are derived from conifers, which are fast growing and may burn at a faster rate. This is one reason why softwood pellets (for pellet stoves) are popular.

The primary advantage of hardwoods is that they tend to contain more potential energy than the same volume of a softwood, thus increasing the amount of potential heat that can be stacked into one stoveload. Hardwood tends to form and maintain a bed of hot coals, which release lower amounts of heat for a long time. Hardwoods are ideal for long, low burns, especially in stoves with a poor ability to sustain a low burn, or in mild weather when high heat output is not required.

Softwoods, in contrast, tend to burn hot and fast with little coaling. They may leave less ash than hardwoods. Softwoods are ideal for fast, hot burns. They produce excellent heat and do not fill the stove with coals, a frequent problem for those pushing their hardwood-fired stoves hard to get the maximum possible heat out of them.

Not all hardwoods have a higher potential energy content than all softwoods. Wood varies by species and even individual trees (a tree with many years of slow growth will have a higher BTU content than a tree of the same species and same size than a tree with a few years of rapid growth). Osage orange, also known as hedge, is perhaps the highest-BTU wood that is common in North America.

Many softwoods will season (dry) much more quickly than many hardwoods. For example, pine that has been cut, split, stacked and topcovered will usually be ready to burn in one year; oak may be expected to take three years under the same conditions.

==== Softwood mythology ====
Softwood is often said to be dangerous to burn because it generates more dangerous creosote than hardwood. This myth is pervasive in the North American northeast, where both types of wood are commonly available. It is not common in the northwest, where most full-time wood burners burn pine and fir exclusively.

It is possible that this myth originated with old-fashioned stoves and fireplaces. These appliances did not require seasoned wood, and frequently did not receive it. As a result, they often experienced very low flue temperatures — usually in flues that were not insulated as modern flues are. The combination of low firebox temperatures due to high moisture content in the wood and low flue temperatures due to lack of insulation led to high levels of creosote accumulation. Burning a wood that emits a lot of sparks (such as pine) in an old-fashioned fireplace or stove will lead to sparks going directly into the flue, which can lead to a dangerous chimney fire if the flue is coated in creosote.

Modern stoves which are operated properly do not cause this high level of creosote accumulation. While different wood species do contain varying levels of volatile organic compounds, the difference is inconsequential since all woods produce creosote which accumulates if burned improperly. So-called dangerous woods such as pine are in fact safer than woods such as oak, as they will burn hotter and thus help keep flue temperatures up, and their fast seasoning will help ensure that novice wood burners are burning reasonably dry wood.

==== Moisture content and creosote ====
Dry wood produces more usable heat than wet wood, since the energy isn’t being used to evaporate the water from the wood before it can burn. Freshly cut wood (known as green wood) has a high moisture content. Different wood species have different moisture contents, which also vary tree to tree. Burning fuel that is mostly water uses much of the combustion energy to evaporate the water. This results in low firebox temperatures and low flue temperatures.

Firewood with a moisture content below 20 per cent by weight can burn efficiently. This is the "free" moisture content absorbed in the wood fibers, and does not include the chemically-bound hydrogen and oxygen content. Moisture content can be reduced by outdoor air-drying ("seasoning"), for a period of several months in summer weather. Solar-powered or fuel-fired kilns can accelerate the drying process.

The most common process of removing the excess moisture is called seasoning. Seasoning by air-drying the wood can take three years or more. Wood is dried in outdoor well-ventilated covered structures, or in a kiln.

All wood will release creosote vapors when burned. Modern stoves will burn the vapors, either via direct secondary combustion or via a catalyst. Very little, if any, creosote will escape a properly operating modern stove's secondary combustion.

Creosote that does escape may still not be harmful if it leaves the wood in gaseous form. It will not condense on surfaces above 250 degrees Fahrenheit (121 °C). Modern flues are insulated to help ensure that they do not fall below this temperature during normal stove operation. Creosote accumulation can be dangerous, as it is flammable and burns hot. If a flue is coated with creosote and ignited, perhaps by a spark going up the flue, it can cause a serious chimney fire that can lead to a structure fire. This can be avoided by using modern stoves and flue standards, burning dry wood, keeping fires hot enough to maintain flue temperatures of at least 250 degrees F (121 °C) at the top of the flue, and proper chimney cleaning as needed.

=== Multi-fuel models ===
Multi-fuel stove designs are common in Europe. They burn solid fuels only, including wood, wood pellets, coal and peat. They are typically made of steel or cast iron. Some models are also boiler stoves, with an attached water tank to provide hot water, and they can also be connected to radiators to add heat to the house, though they are usually not as efficient as a dedicated wood boiler.

There are also stove models that can switch from wood fuel to oil or gas sources that are installed in the house to supply heat to a separate water boiler. Stoves that readily convert to either oil or gas in addition to wood fuel have been manufactured in North America and Europe since the early 20th century, and are still manufactured. In some models, the oil or gas may fuel the stove through a pipe connection leading to a "pot burner" in the rear of the firewood compartment in the stove.

Multi-fuel stoves are versatile, but usually perform poorly compared to a stove that is designed to burn one specific fuel as well as possible.

=== Catalytic and non-catalytic stoves ===
Modern wood stoves universally have some method of secondary combustion to burn unburned gasses for greatly improved efficiency and emissions. One common method is via a catalyst.

A catalytic wood stove will re-burn the gasses from the firebox in a catalyst- a matrix of steel or ceramic plated with a catalyst that allows combustion of these gasses at much lower temperatures than would ordinarily be possible. This is why among modern stoves, catalytic models tend to be much better at achieving low, even heat output, which is desirable in warmer weather.

Modern non-catalytic wood stoves will also reburn the gasses from the firebox, but require a much higher temperature for the secondary combustion. No catalyst is required. These models lose a large amount of efficiency at low burn rates, as they cannot maintain secondary combustion, but can be very efficient at higher temperatures when that comes into effect.

There also exist hybrid stoves that employ both catalytic and non-catalytic secondary combustion.

Stoves that do not employ any secondary combustion still exist, but are markedly less efficient and more polluting since unburnt products are left to leave via the flue.

=== Pyrolyzing stoves ===
In a conventional stove, when wood is added to a hot fire, a process of pyrolysis or destructive distillation begins. Gases (or volatiles) are evolved which are burned above the solid fuel. These are the two distinct processes going on in most solid fuel appliances. In obsolete stoves without secondary combustion, air had to be admitted both below and above the fuel to attempt to increase combustion and efficiency. The correct balance was difficult to achieve in practice, and many obsolete wood-burning stoves only admitted air above the fuel as a simplification. Often the volatiles were not completely burned, resulting in energy loss, chimney tarring, and atmospheric pollution.

To overcome this, the pyrolyzing stove was developed. The two processes go on in separate parts of the stove with separately controlled air supplies. Most stoves designed to burn wood pellets fall into this category.

Most pyrolyzing stoves regulate both fuel and air supply as opposed to controlling combustion of a mass of fuel by simple air regulation as in traditional stoves.

The pelleted fuel is typically introduced into the pyrolyzing chamber with a screw conveyor. This leads to better and more efficient combustion of the fuel.

The technology is not actually new; it has been used for decades in industrial coal-fired boilers intended to burn coal with high volatile content.

== Safety and pollution considerations ==
Reliance on wood as an energy source is thought to contribute to deforestation and climate change, but the CO_{2} emissions from wood-derived fuels are the same as emissions from natural decay.

=== Health effects ===
Wood burners emit polluting compounds which are harmful to human health, including carcinogens. There is a common misconception that the pollutants are comparatively safe because they are "natural", but the real health impacts are equivalent to those of other common air pollutants such as diesel fumes. In the 2010s, 61,000 premature deaths were attributable annually to ambient air pollution from residential heating with wood and coal in Europe, with an additional 10,000 attributable deaths in North America. The use of wood-burning stoves in Africa is associated with a large number of deaths each year, approximately 463,000.

=== Safety ===
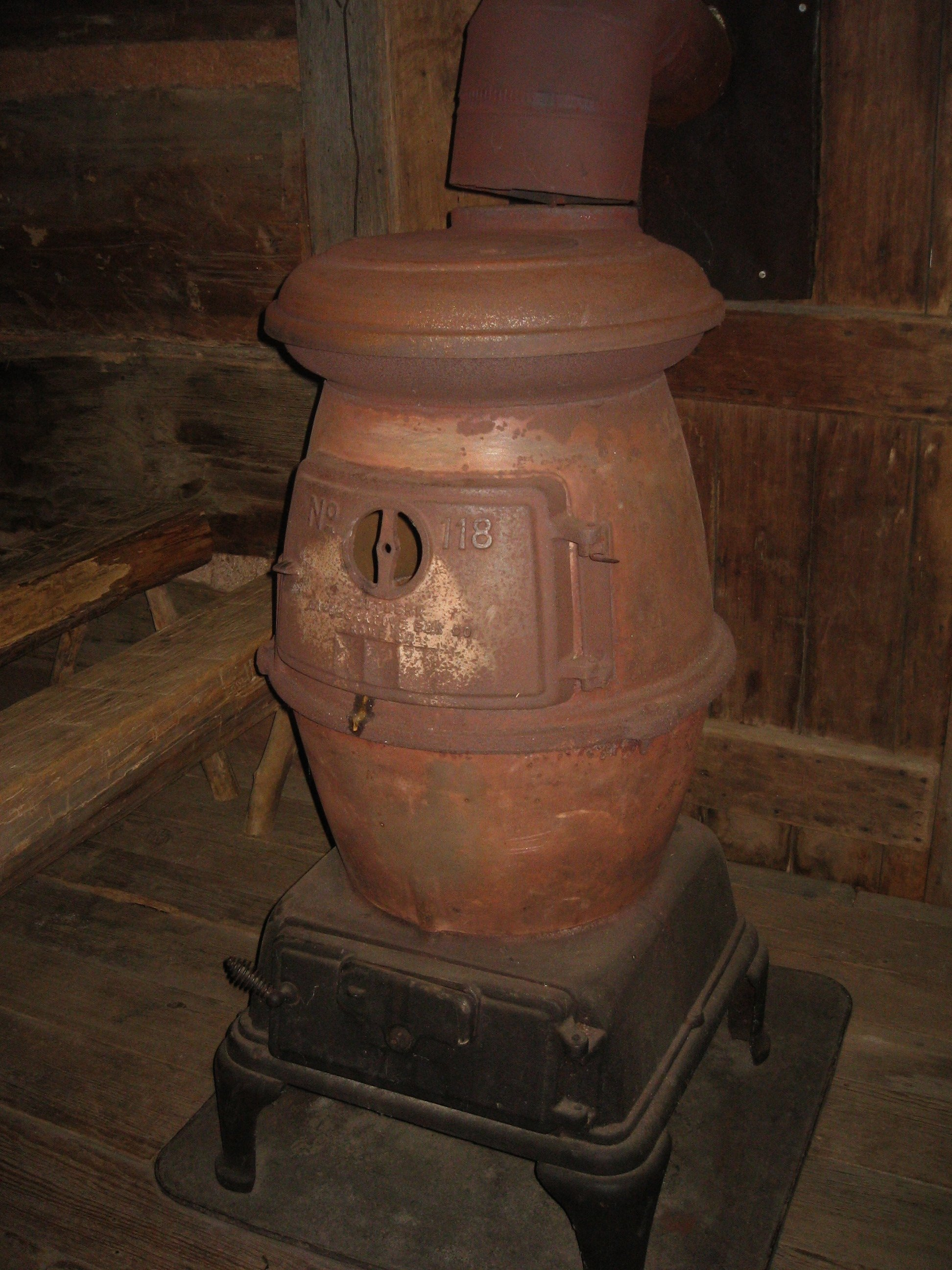
Potbelly stove at the Museum of Appalachia

Correct air flow and ventilation are also critical to efficient and safe wood burning. Specific requirements will be laid down by the stove manufacturer. Legal requirements for new installations in the UK can be found in Building Regulations Approved Document J, Section 2, Table 1 "Air Supply to solid fuel appliances".

The safe operation of a wood-burning stove requires regular maintenance such as emptying ash pans (containers) beneath the wood grate. Routine cleaning of the stove pipes and chimney is also needed to prevent chimney fires. Creosote and soot gradually build up in stovepipes and chimneys. This could damage the chimney and spread fire to the surrounding structure, especially the roof. When soot blocks the airflow through the stove pipes or chimney, smoke can build up in the stove pipes and in the house.

The basic principle of controlling combustion by reducing the air supply means that very often there is a reduction zone/conditions within the stove. This means that carbon dioxide is often "reduced" to carbon monoxide, which is highly poisonous and must not be allowed to escape into the home. This can occur if the stove or chimney has not been cleaned or there is insufficient ventilation. Carbon monoxide detectors or alarms should always be installed according to manufacturers' recommendations where a wood stove is in use. Not all smoke detectors detect carbon monoxide.

Fuel accelerants such as coal, grease, oil, gasoline, kerosene, plastics, and so on, also must never be added to firewood in a wood stove, since the flames produced may easily overwhelm the wood compartment and stove pipes and create a house fire.

=== UK smoke control areas ===
Under the United Kingdom's Clean Air Act, local authorities may declare the whole or part of the district of the authority to be a smoke control area. It is an offence to emit smoke from a chimney of a building, from a furnace or from any fixed boiler if located in a designated smoke control area. It is also an offence to acquire an "unauthorized fuel" for use within a smoke control area unless it is used in an "exempt" appliance ("exempted" from the controls which generally apply in the smoke control area). The current maximum level of fine is £1,000 for each offence.

In order to comply with the Clean Air Act in "smoke control areas", an exempt appliance or fuel must be used.

=== US pollution control requirements ===
The United States Clean Air Act requires that wood stoves be certified by the Environmental Protection Agency (EPA).

However, the EPA had no mandatory emission limits for pellet stoves, indoor or outdoor wood boilers, masonry stoves and certain types of wood stoves that are exempt from EPA regulation. EPA developed new regulations which began to come into effect in 2015, establishing mandatory emission limits for almost all wood-burning appliances (fireplaces, chimeneas, and some other special appliances will still be exempt).

In 2019, EPA's mandatory smoke emission limit for wood stoves in 2019 was 4.5 grams of smoke per hour (g/h) under Step 1 of the revised standards of performance for wood burning room heaters. Washington State has also had requirements of a maximum of 4.5 grams per hour.

The New Source Performance Standards (NSPS) for Residential Wood Heaters came into effect on May 15, 2020. The EPA initiated wood stove emissions standards in 1988 to mitigate air pollution, setting the initial limits at 7.5 grams per hour for non-catalytic and 4.1 grams for catalytic stoves. These regulations have been refined over time, notably in 2015 with a phased approach to lower emissions. The first phase capped emissions at 4.5 grams per hour, and the second phase further reduced this limit to either 2.0 or 2.5 grams per hour, based on the testing technique employed.

The latest "Phase IV" or "Step 2 Standards" demand stricter criteria for wood stoves, notably shifting from crib wood to cord wood for testing. Previously, the EPA utilized crib wood, consistent in size and arrangement, for reliable testing burns. However, this method didn't mirror actual stove usage in homes, where the more variable cord wood is standard. This change aims for more realistic emissions testing, acknowledging the diversity in wood size, moisture, and type used in residences.

=== Justa stoves, rocket stoves and haybox stoves ===
In some places, such as the Caribbean, Central America and South America, many houses have wood-burning stoves that are used indoors without any means of proper ventilation. Smoke stays in the house, where it is breathed in by the residents, harming their health. Nearly two million people are killed each year by indoor air pollution caused by open-fire cooking, mostly women and children, according to the World Health Organization (WHO). The cutting of large amounts of firewood also endangers local forests and ecosystems.

Non-governmental organizations (NGOs) such as Rotary International are actively assisting homeowners in constructing more fuel-efficient and safe wood-burning stoves. One design is called the Justa stove, Just stove, Ecostove, or La Estufa Justa. Justa stoves are made out of such materials as adobe, cement, and pumice, with chimneys. Other wood-burning stoves types are also being introduced to these communities, such as rocket stoves and haybox stoves. A rocket stove is up to 30% more fuel efficient than a Justa stove, but a small portable rocket stove (for cooking) does not have a chimney and is suitable for outdoor use only. Bigger rocket stoves are connected to chimney or flue-exhaust pipe. The haybox stove is another outdoor wood-burning stove. Haybox stoves use straw, wool, or foam as an insulator, reducing fuel use by up to 70%.

== Use in Europe ==
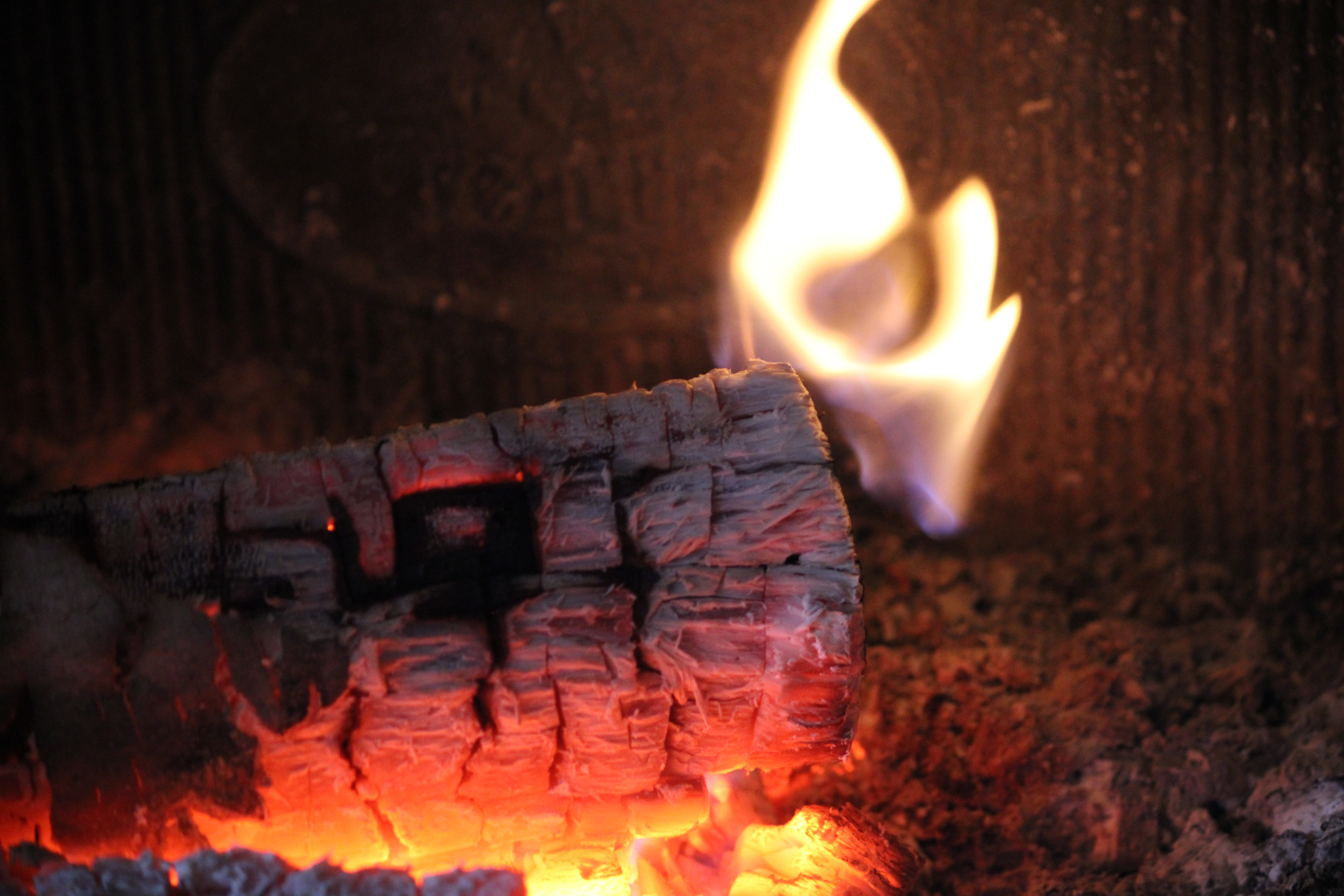
Wood on fire inside a wood-burning stove

Italy is one of the biggest markets for pellet-burning stoves in Europe, having around 30% of all homes using wood for some heat. This means about 5 million homes have a wood fueled stove or cooker.

It has been claimed that, in the UK, domestic wood burning has become the single biggest source of small particle air pollution. However, UK Gov. (DEFRA) statistics do not support this claim with road transport and industrial processes both being larger polluters.

== Types ==
- Franklin stove, originally invented by Benjamin Franklin, is a more efficient type of wood-burning fireplace. It was finicky and never caught on, but many stoves continue to be referred to as "Franklin" stoves.
- Carl Johan Cronstedt is reported to have increased efficiency of wood-burning stoves by a factor of eight in the mid-18th century.
- Wolfgang Schroeter invented the first wood-burning stove with a cast iron frame and glass door. This allowed the user to see the fire burning inside the stove.
- A fireplace insert converts a wood-burning fireplace to a wood-burning stove. A fireplace insert is a self-contained unit that rests inside the existing fireplace and chimney. They produce less smoke and require less wood than a traditional fireplace. Fireplace inserts come in different sizes for large or small homes.
- Down draft or cross draft gasification stoves, i.e. Dunsley Yorkshire, Welkom 600, Avalon Arbor™ wood stove, XEOOS.
- Boiler stoves provide hot water as well as space heating. A backboiler can be an optional insert added to the back of the firebox, or a wrap-around water jacket that is an integral to the stove's structure. The choice determines how much of the stove's output goes to space heating as opposed to heating water.
- Rocket mass heaters are a type of fuel-efficient stove, named in the 1970s, but dating back millennia in concept. A super-hot chimney above the fire draws the flames sideways and up, blending hot fuel and air into a quick, hot, clean-burning fire that takes little wood, leaves little residue, and has many uses.
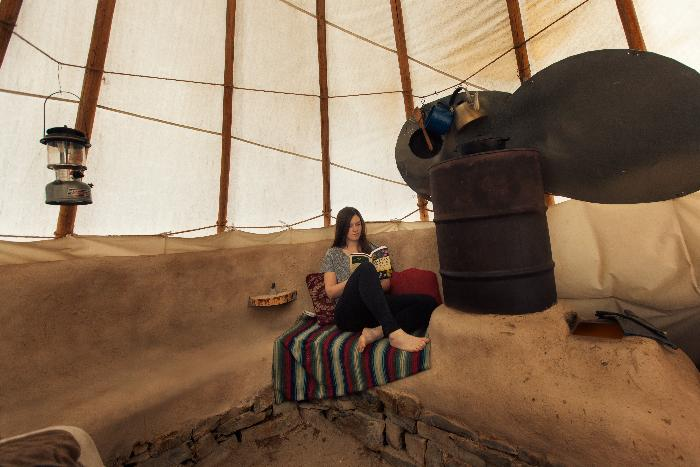
Rocket mass heater in a tipi at Paul Wheaton's permaculture homestead in Montana

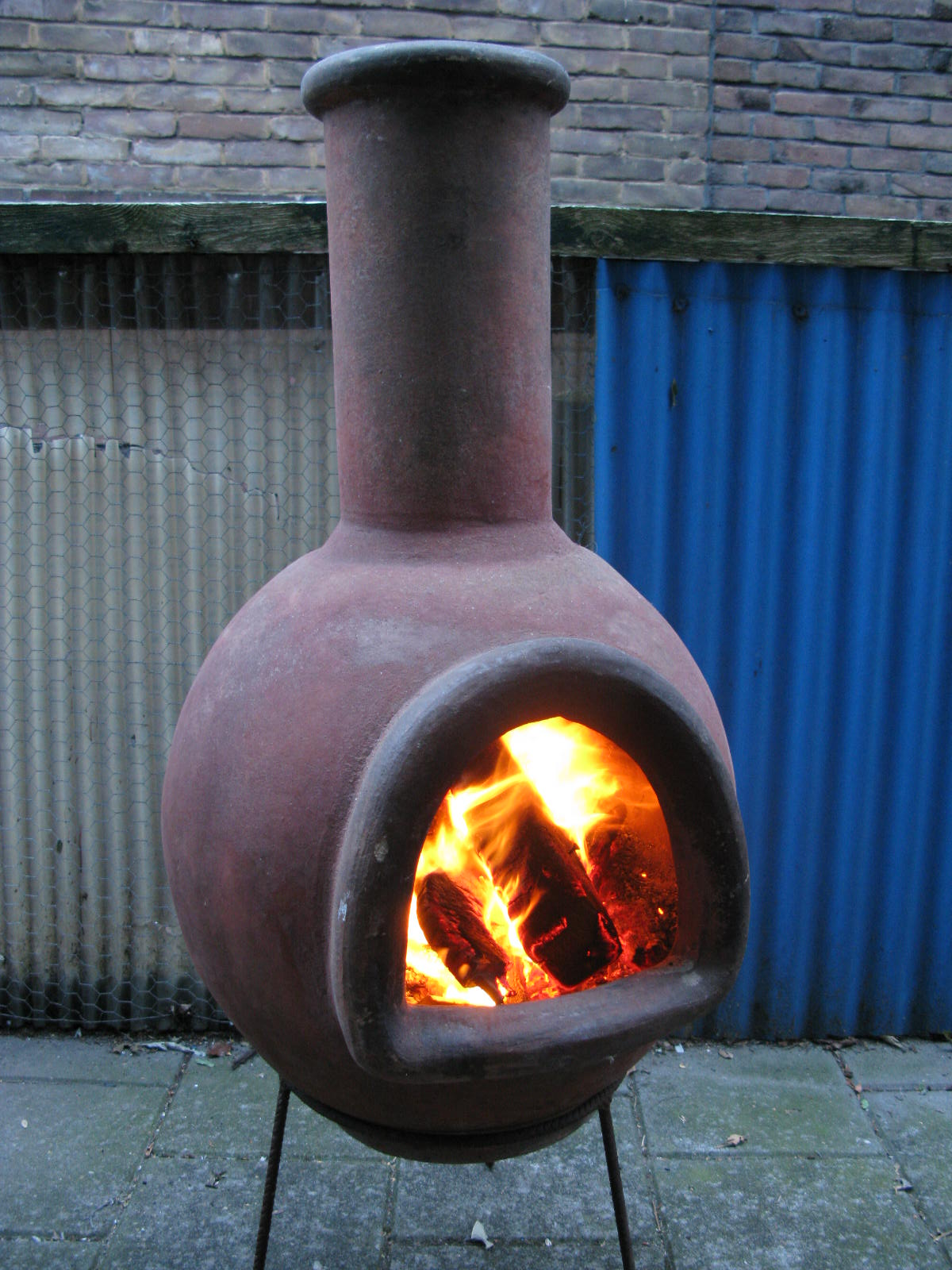
Chimenea, burning wood for heat

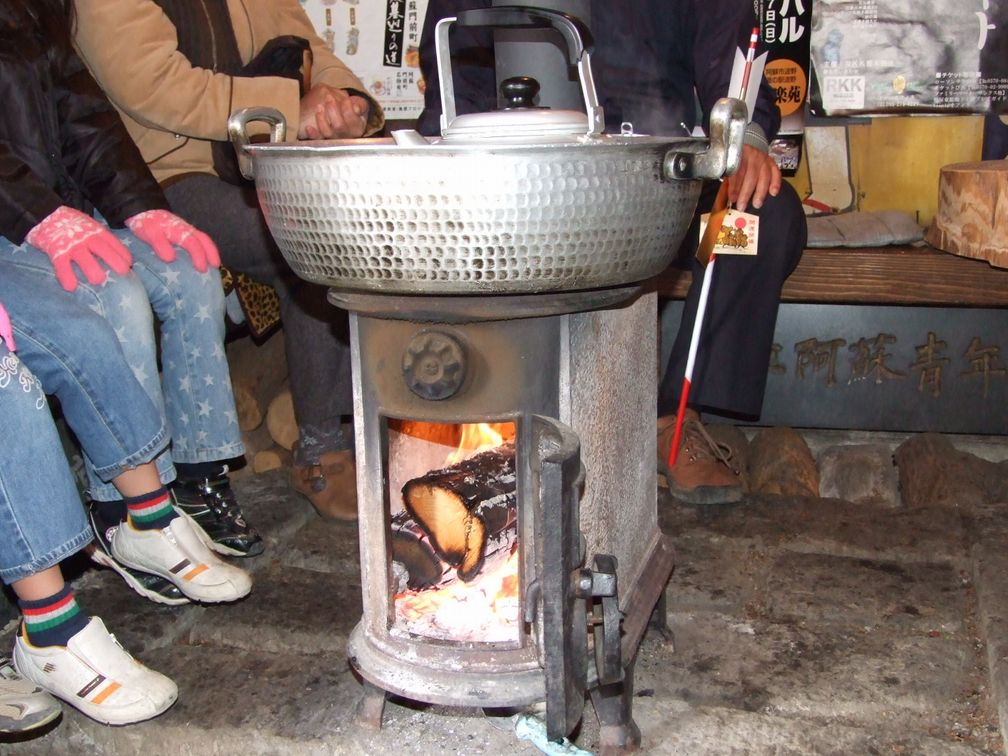
Daruma stove, a traditional Japanese wood-burning stove

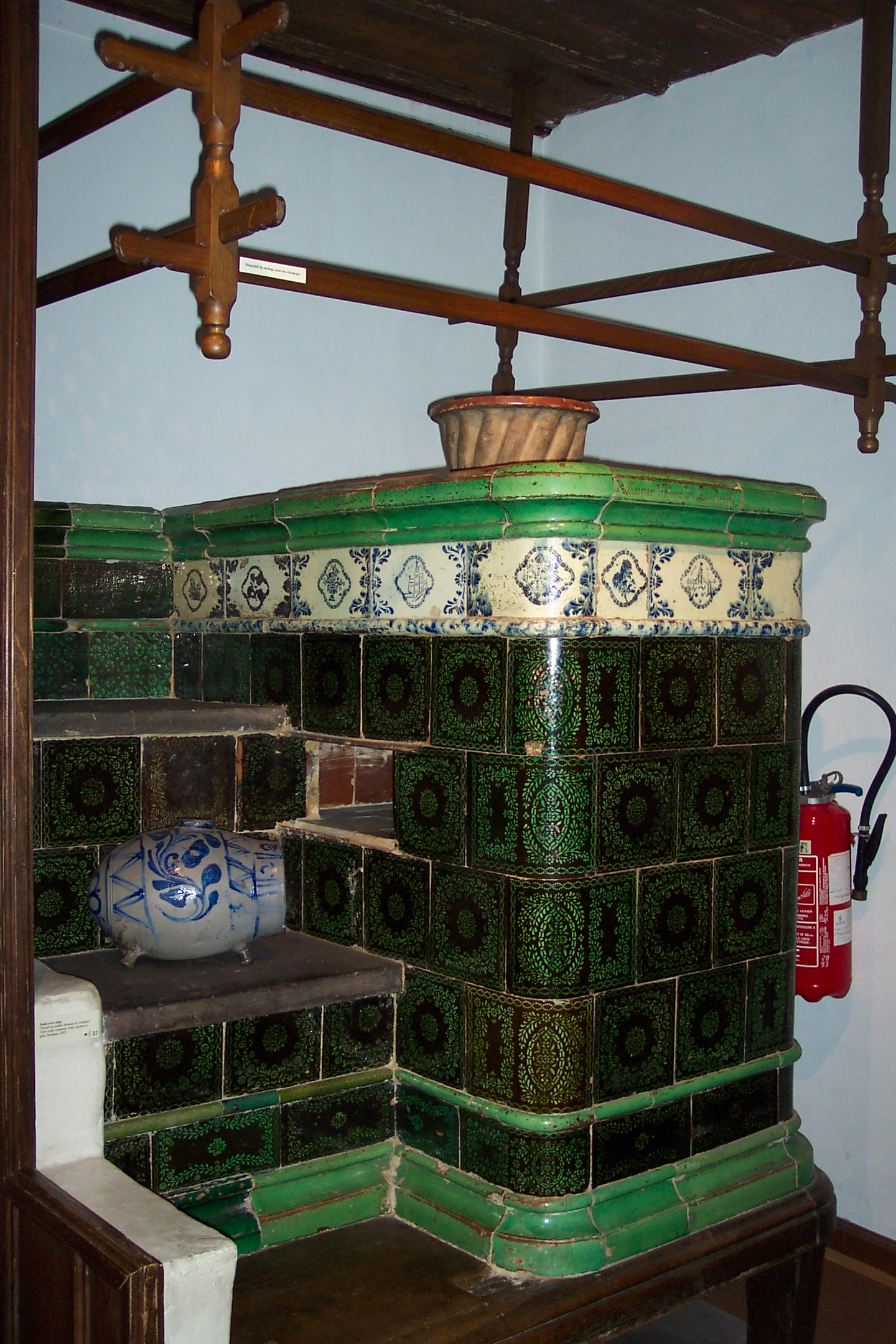
Ceramic-tiled cocklestove wood-burning stove in an Alsatian house, Strasbourg, France. Wooden laundry-drying racks hang over the stove.

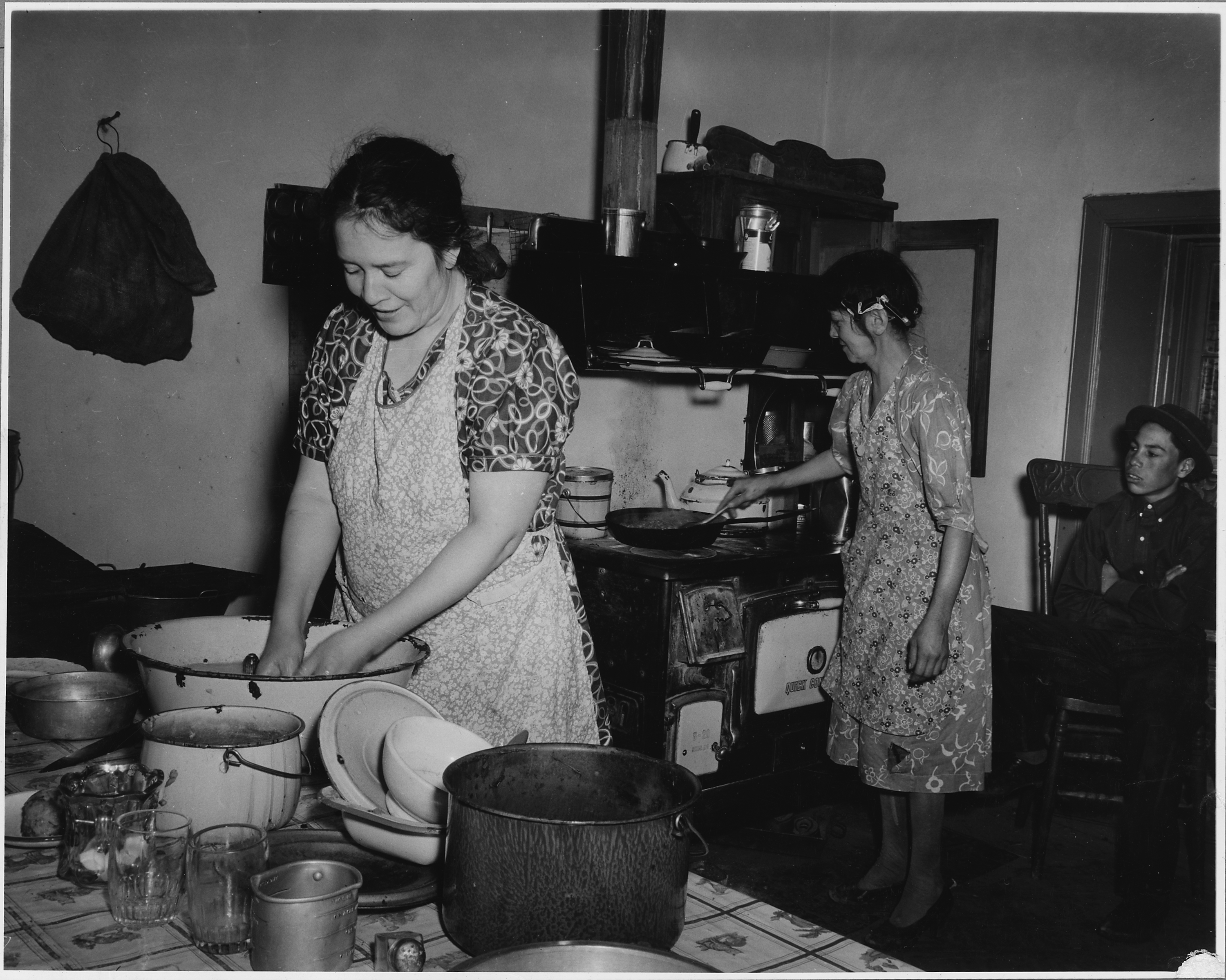
New Mexico woman cooking on a stove typical of North American kitchens, in 1941

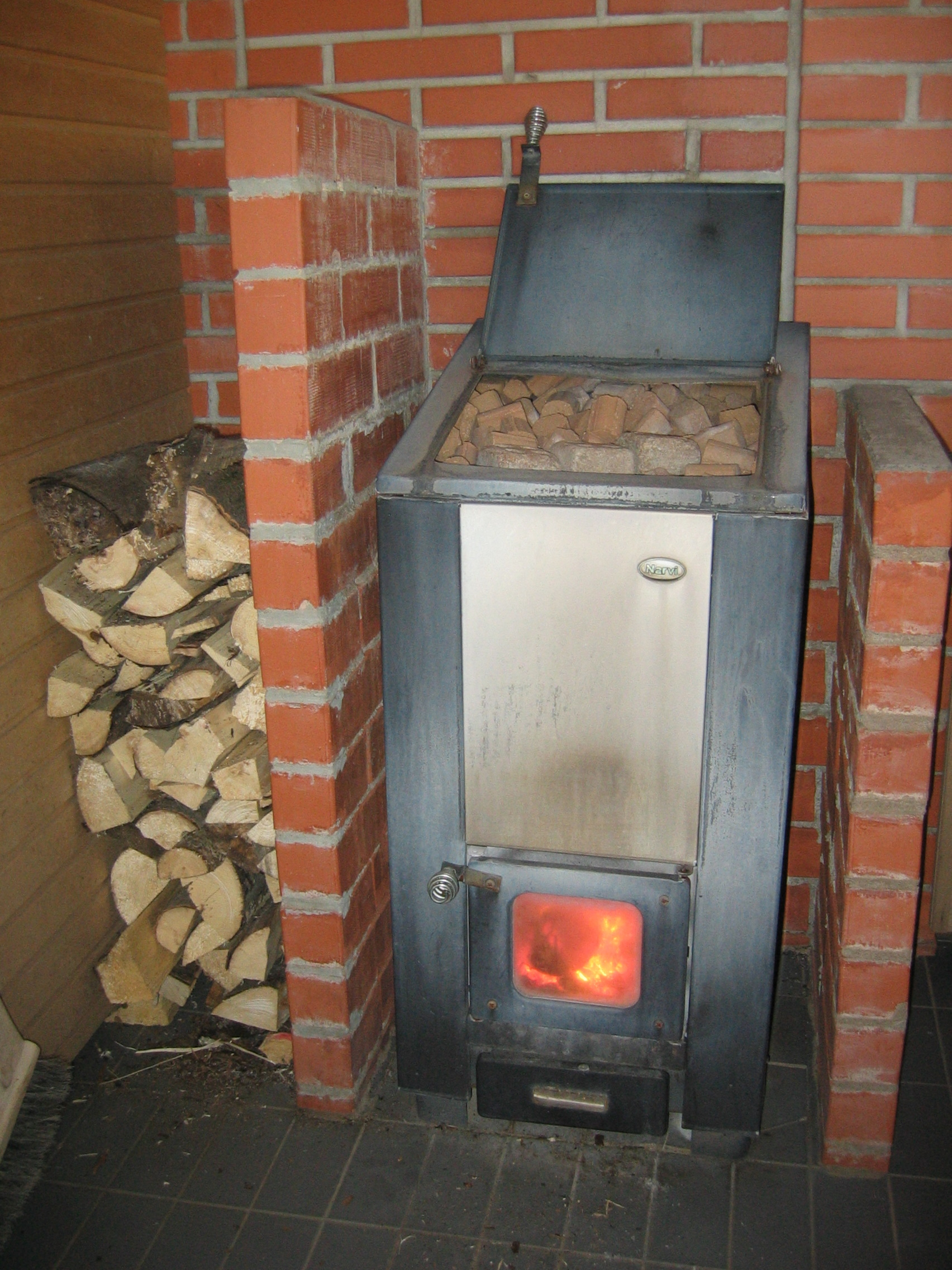
Wood-burning sauna stove, Finland

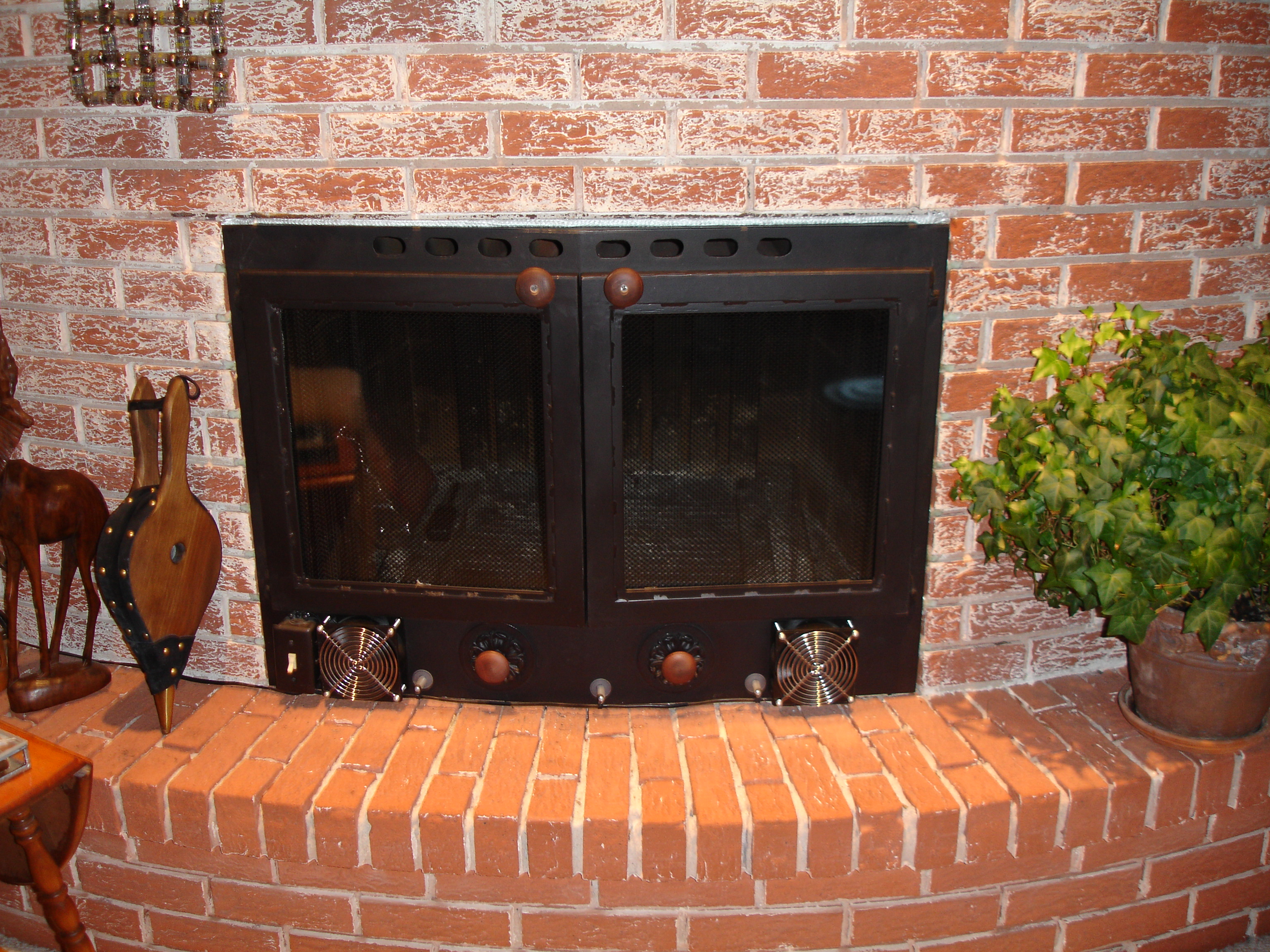
Custom-fitted fireplace insert with large glass doors, and a large heat exchanger for efficiency

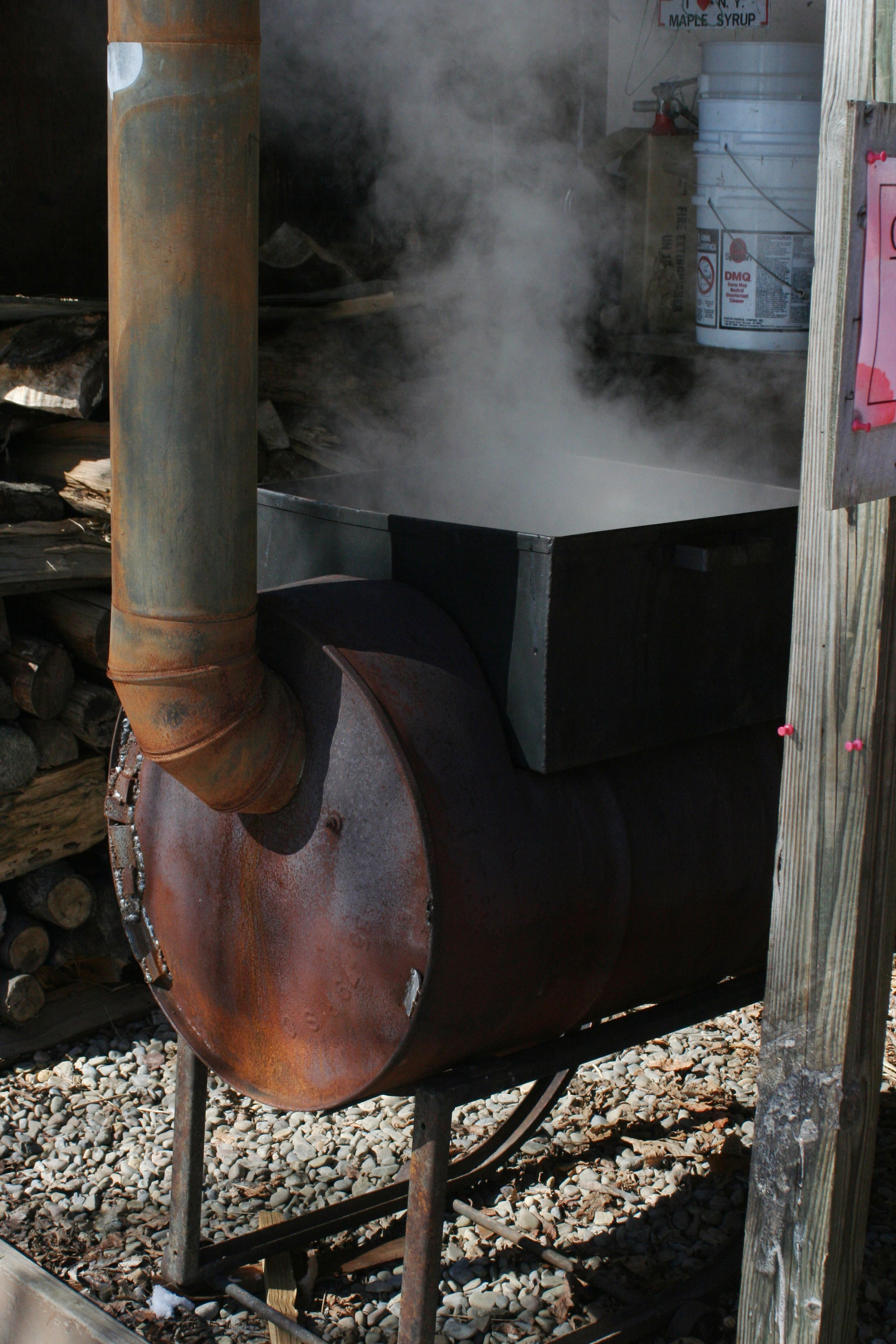
Wood stove used as an outdoor "evaporator" for producing maple syrup, New York State

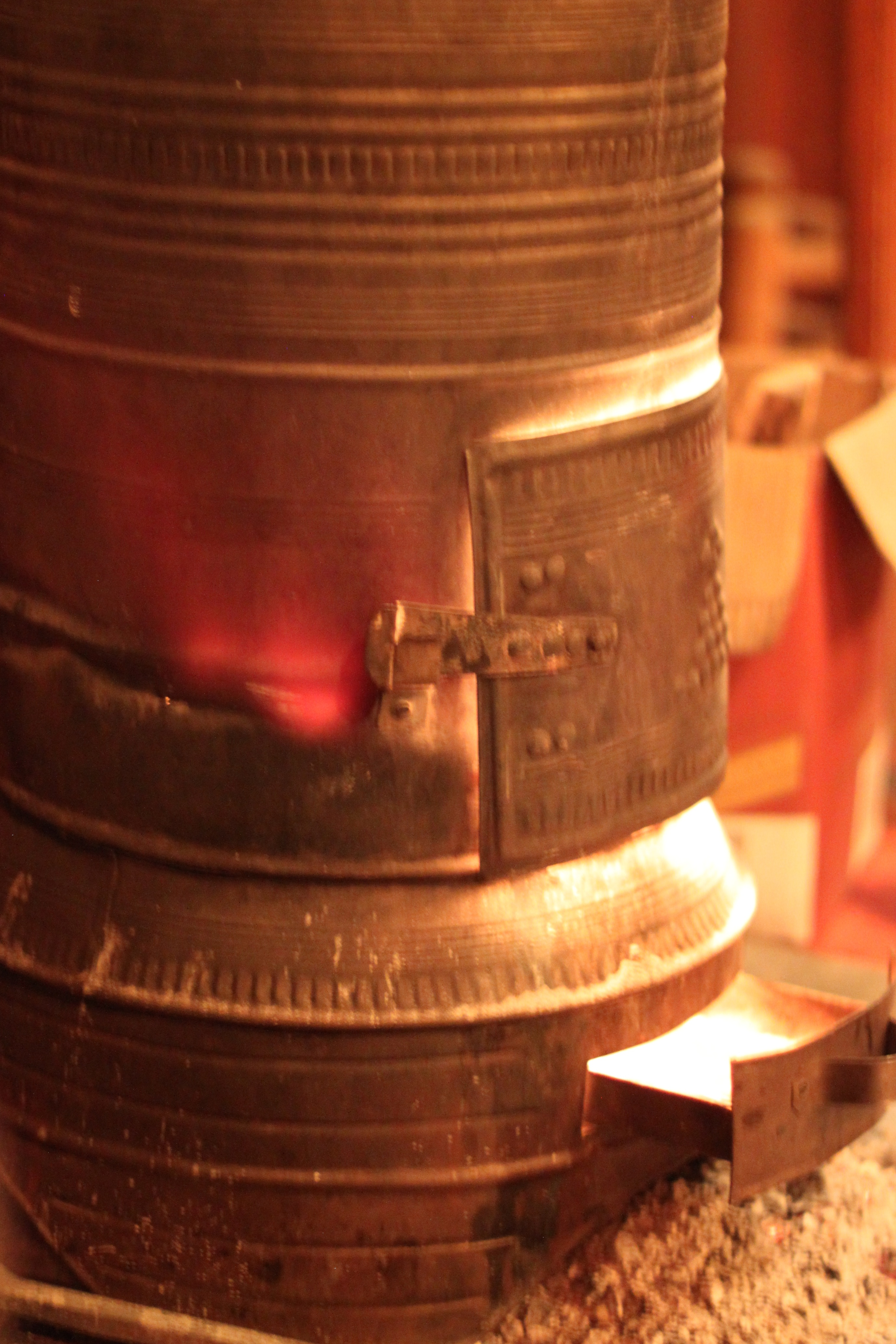
Small pot-bellied stove, Kabul, Afghanistan

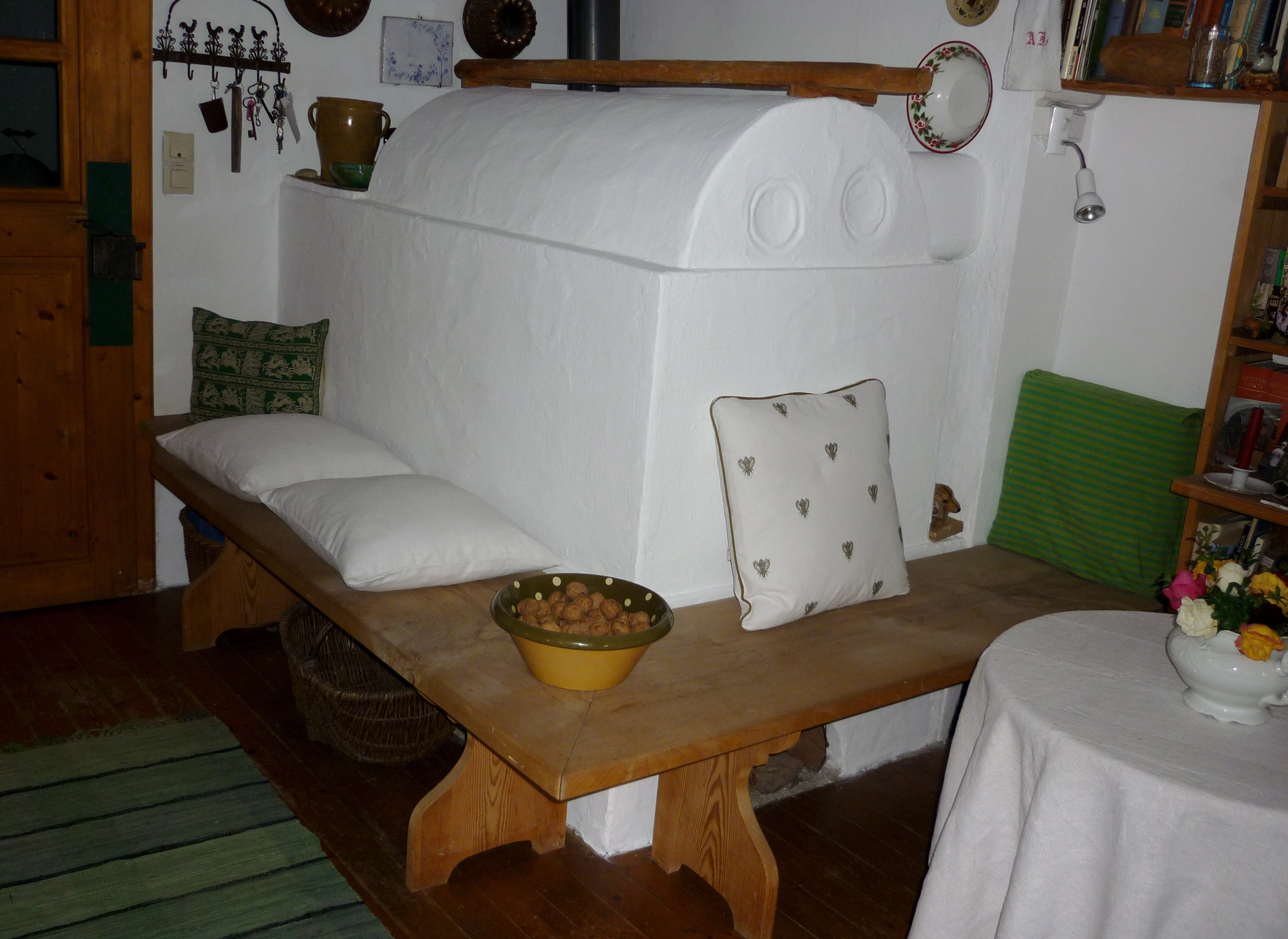
Stove in the living room of a German farm

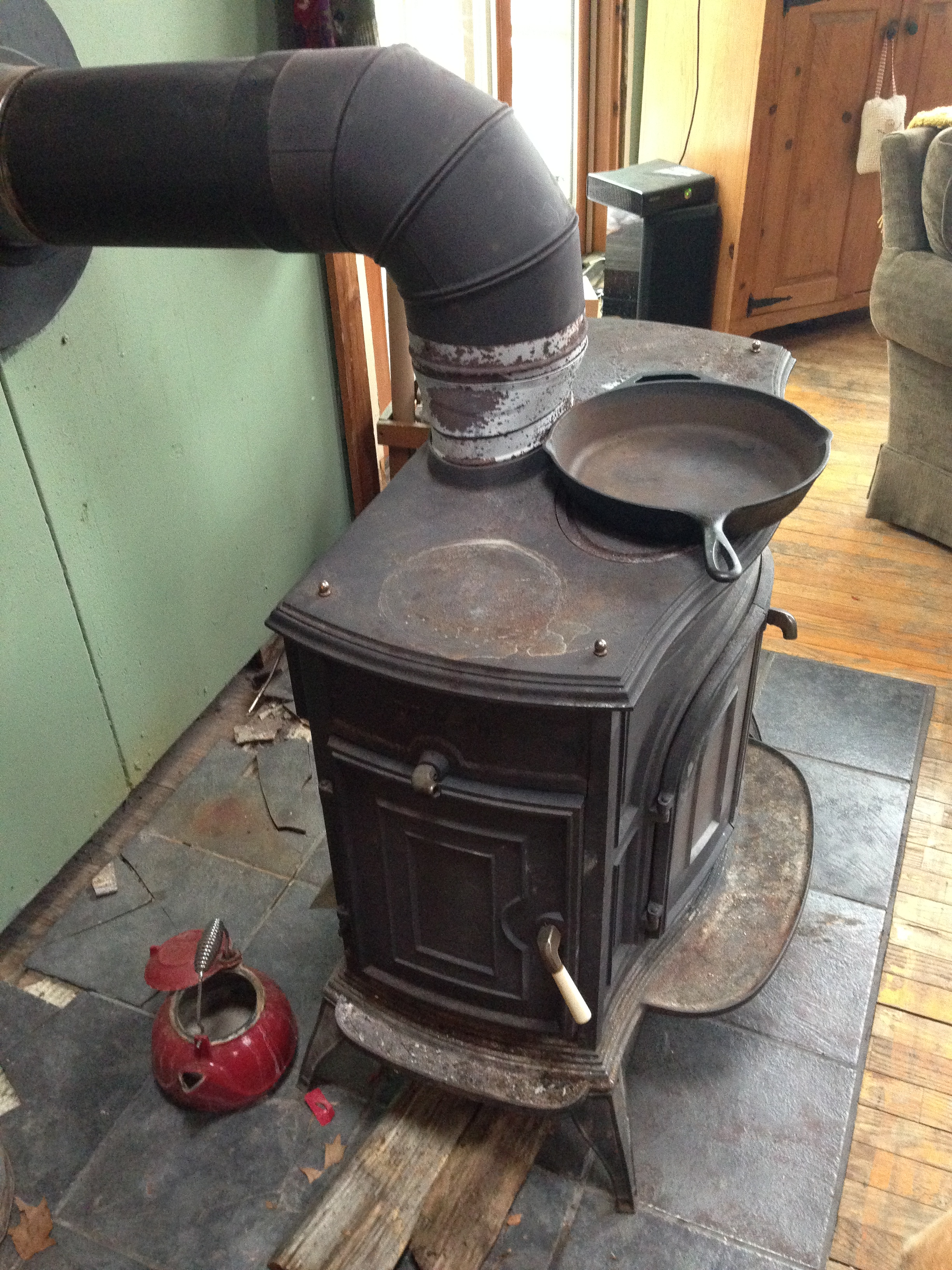
Stove in Massachusetts

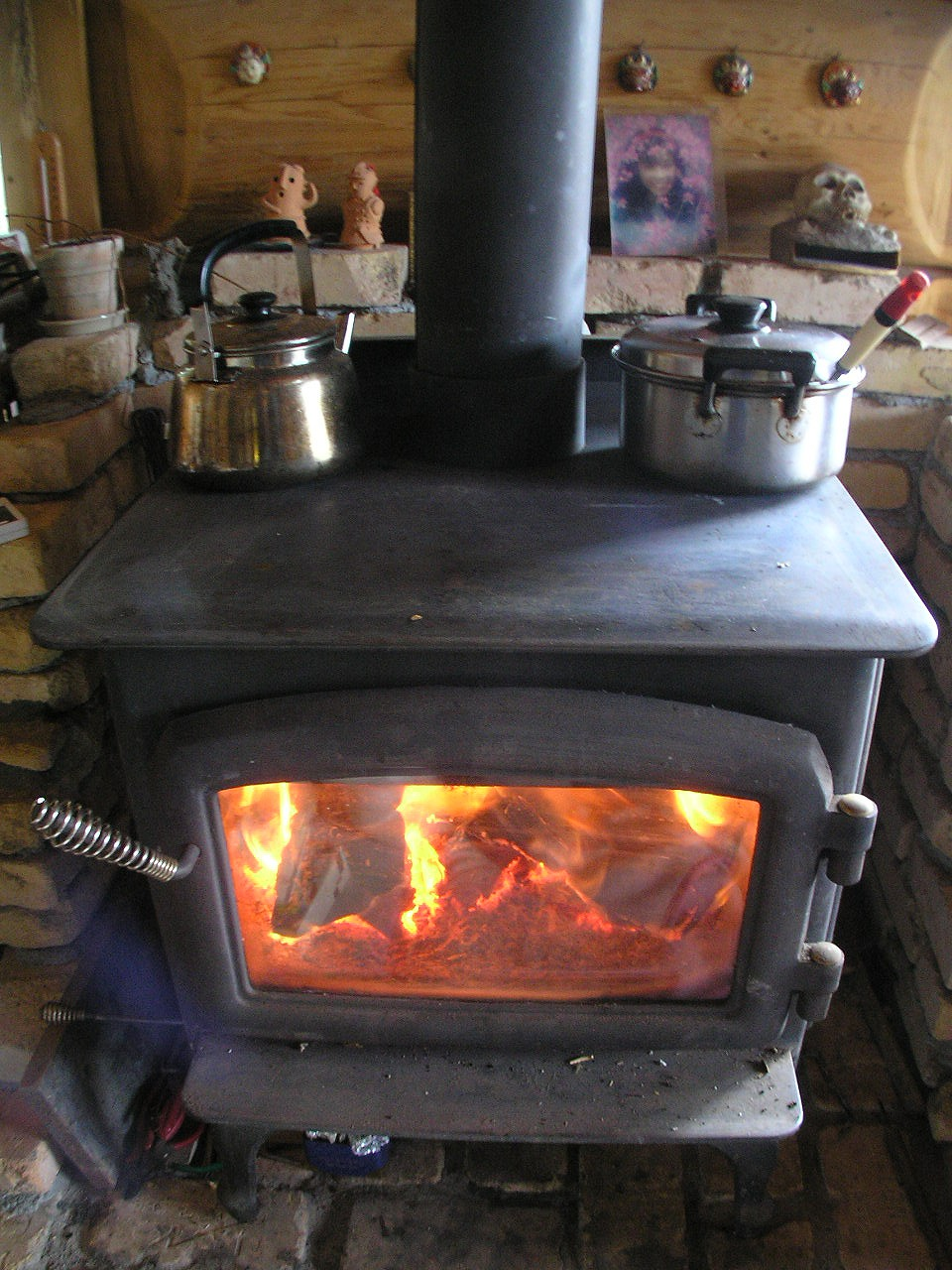
A type that can be cooked on the top plate (Regency)

== See also ==
- Air-tight stove
- Beehive burner
- BioLite
- Bukhari, traditional Indian wood stove
- Cook stove
- Kitchen stove
- List of stoves
- Masonry stove
- Outdoor wood-fired boiler
- Pellet stove
- Portable stove
- Pot-bellied stove
- Rocket stove
- Top-lit updraft gasifier
