= Napoleon (company) =

Manufacturer of fireplaces, grills and furnaces

Wolf Steel Ltd.
- Trade name: Napoleon
- Company type: Private
- Industry: Manufacturing
- Founded: 1976; 50 years ago
- Founder: Wolfgang Schroeter
- Headquarters: Barrie, Ontario, Canada
- Key people: Ingrid Schroeter (Co-Founder); Christopher Schroeter (Co-CEO); Stephen Schroeter (Co-CEO)
- Products: Fireplaces, grills
- Number of employees: 1,600 (2017)
- Website: www.napoleon.com

Wolf Steel Ltd., better known as Napoleon, is a Canadian fireplace manufacturing company. As of 2020, it was the largest privately owned manufacturer of fireplaces, grills, and gas furnaces in North America. Based in Barrie, Ontario, Napoleon began in 1976 as a steel fabrication business under the name Wolf Steel Ltd. In 1995, Napoleon was founded after the company diversified its production to include outdoor heating products.

== History ==
Wolfgang Schroeter began Wolf Steel Ltd. with his wife and co-founder, Ingrid, in 1976. The family enterprise manufactured steel railings in Barrie, Ontario. Schroeter began building wood-burning stoves in his garage, which soon evolved to a cast iron frame with a glass door. This invention was the first of its kind, allowing the user to see the fire inside the stove. In the 1980s and early 1990s, Napoleon's wood stoves were distributed across Canada and the United States.

Napoleon was founded in 1995 after the company introduced barbecue grills to its product line. This trade name was inspired by the Napoleon brandy, not by the French rulers of that name. In 2010, the company developed a charcoal grill to cater to buyers within the European market. In the same year, Napoleon opened branch offices within the United Kingdom, Austria, and the Netherlands. As new barbecue models were developed, Napoleon soon began distribution outside of Europe, where their products were sold in the MENA Region, Mexico, and Chile.

In 2013, Napoleon invented the first 30,000 BTU gas furnace, which was described as the smallest BTU size of any gas furnace sold in the world. Since then, the company has continued developing multiple patented inventions for fireplaces, grills, along with heating and cooling products.

In 2018, Wolfgang and Ingrid Schroeter announced their retirement from Napoleon, while their sons Christopher and Stephen Schroeter were named as the new co-CEOs.

== Production ==
Napoleon's main manufacturing divisions include wood stoves, gas grills, and HVAC products. Each division comes with a research & development department dedicated to engineering new products. Currently, the company employs 1,600 staff around the world, including production facilities in North America, Europe, and Asia. Approximately 80% of their manufacturing is managed from Napoleon's headquarters in Barrie.

== Recognition ==
In 2012, founder Wolfgang Schroeter was awarded the Queen Elizabeth II, Diamond Jubilee Medal, for his business achievements in Canada.

Since 2013, Deloitte recognized Napoleon as one of Canada's Best Managed Companies and retained that honor for the past seven years. In 2018, Napoleon won the Brand Builder Awards Marketer of the Year, which recognized innovative marketing campaigns in the residential and commercial design and construction industries. In 2020, Napoleon was the recipient of multiple Vesta awards by Hearth & Home magazine, including the categories of Best-In-Show Hearth Products, Electric Products, and Wood Products.
