= Multi-fuel stove =

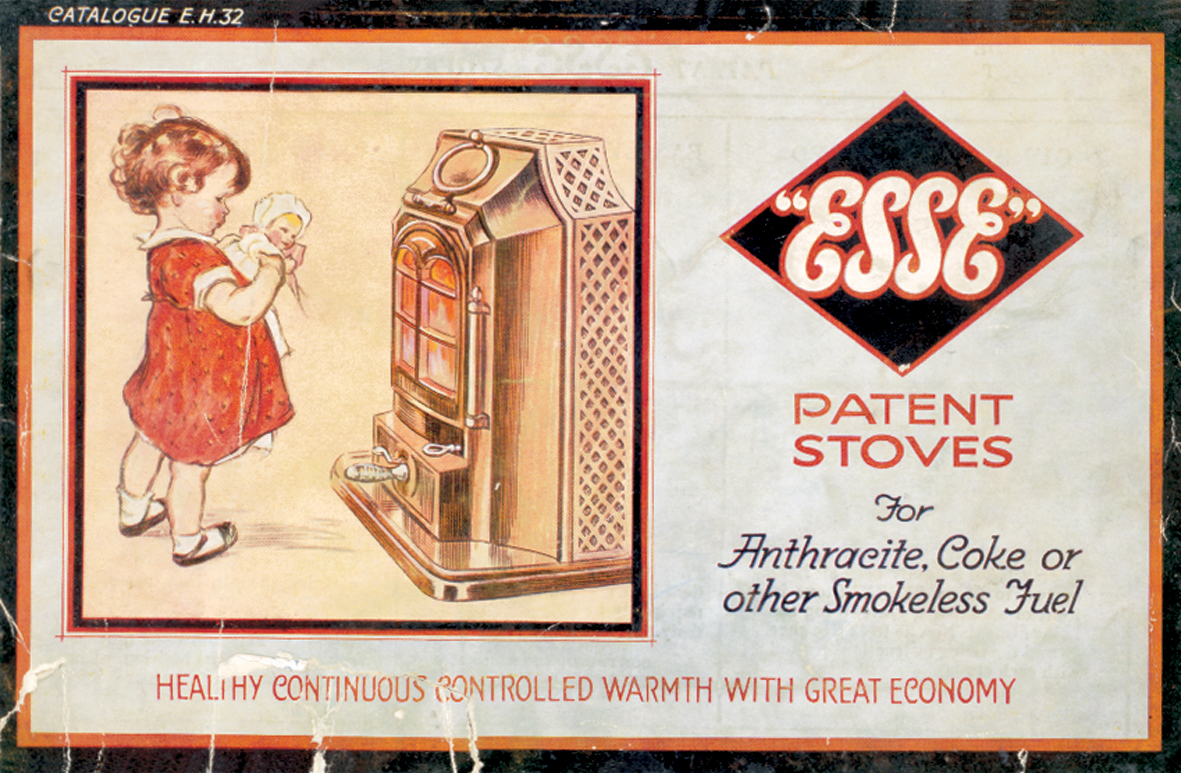
A 1922 advertisement from a Scottish stove manufacturer for a multifuel stove. This one burned anthracite and coke.

A multi-fuel stove is similar to a wood-burning stove in appearance and design. Multifuel refers to the capability of the stove to burn wood and also coal, wood pellets, or peat. Stoves that have a grate for the fire to burn on and a removable ash pan are generally considered multi-fuel stoves. If the fire simply burns on a bed of ash, it is a wood-only fuelled appliance, and cannot be used for coal or peat.

== Home use ==
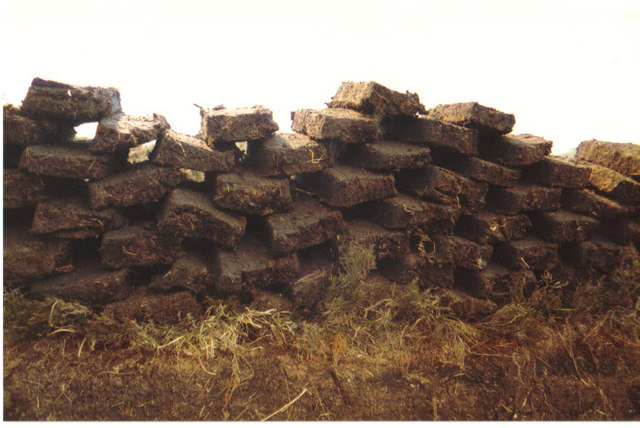
"Peats" drying for stove fuel, Isle of Skye.

Multi-fuel stoves have been common in the northern United Kingdom, Ireland, and continental Europe since the 19th century. They are made either for cooking, heating, or both. They may double as a boiler, heating a tank of water for household use. With a boiler, the stove can also be connected to a radiator system to increase space heating in the home.

As people turn to alternative ways of heating such stoves have become increasingly popular.

In Scotland and Ireland in particular, coal and peat have historically been common solid fuel for stoves. Peat cutters use a tool called a tarasgeir in Gaelic. Peat sources are now scarce in some locations, however. As peat stoves were replaced by oil and electric heat in many homes during the 20th century, many peat banks were designated environmentally-protected land. Other peat banks are often depleted.

In the United Kingdom, stoves sold since January 2022 must meet minimum efficiency regulations. In smoke control areas, stoves must burn smokeless fuel or have their design approved by DEFRA. In England since 2023, it is illegal to burn coal (except smokeless coal) or wet wood at home.

== History ==
Household wood- and peat-burning stoves have existed since ancient Rome and Greece. Peat continues to be burned as heating fuel in eastern Europe. During the 1970s, peat consumption was as much as 60 million tons per year in the Soviet Union.

The industrialization of coal mining led to a sharp increase in the burning of coal in stoves for home heating and cooking. Coal burns with twice the heat content of wood or peat, creating greater heat. Coal's greatest drawback, aside from being non-renewable, is that it creates thick, toxic smoke. This creates dense smog in urban areas, for example, in London, England during the Victorian era.

== Multi-fuel camping stoves ==
Multi-fuel stoves also exist for camping and trekking use. They are lightweight and burn liquid fuel such as white gas, kerosene, or even automobile petrol, depending upon the stove model. Refillable and pre-filled fuel canisters are sold for these stoves. Liquid fuel is mixed with air (vaporized) and channeled through an opening called the "jet" toward the burner. Some designs require "priming" before use, by pumping the stove several times to release air and fuel through the jet.

Operating a portable multi-fuel stove can be technically challenging, and practising the set-up and use of the stove before travelling with it is advisable. There are several stove designs that operate differently, and manufacturer's instructions should be followed for safety and correct operation.

== See also ==
- Cook stove
- Firewood
- Portable stove
- Wood-burning stove
- Wood pellets
