= Ianto Evans =

Welsh-American architect

Ianto Evans is a Welsh-American applied ecologist, landscape architect, inventor, writer, social critic, and teacher. He is known for his work building, writing and teaching about natural building, cob and high-efficiency solid-fuel stoves, ovens and heaters.

== Career ==
Originally from Wales, Evans attended architecture school in the 1960s. With Linda Smiley, Evans built what may have been the first cob house in North America after researching cob structures in the British Isles. They moved into the cottage in 1989. They joined with Michael Smith to establish the Cob Cottage Company in 1993. They also founded the North American School of Natural Building and innovated a distinctive "Oregon Cob" method, hosting numerous workshops on the technique.

Evans was director of Aprovecho's Fava Bean Project, in Cottage Grove, Oregon, where he worked to adapt fava beans to American climates. As a permaculturalist, he developed a polyculture planting technique. In the late 1970s, he invented the rocket mass heater.

In the 1970s, Evans worked in Guatemala and Costa Rica, developing the Lorena cook stove, an efficient contra-flow cooking stove made from the same materials as unfired brick (sand bound together by clay subsoil).

As a back-to-the-lander and natural builder, Evans is critical of industrial civilization, corporate media, technology, and modern construction methods.

Evans lives in the United States, near Coquille, Oregon.

== Works ==
- Evans, Ianto; Smiley, Linda; Smith, Michael (2002). The Hand-Sculpted House: A Practical and Philosophical Guide to Building a Cob Cottage. White River Junction, Vt.: Chelsea Green Pub. Co. ISBN 978-1-890132-34-7.
- Evans, Ianto; Jackson, Leslie (2006–2014). Rocket Mass Heaters: Superefficient Woodstoves You Can Build. Coquille, OR: Cob Cottage Co. ISBN 978-0-9663738-3-7.

== See also ==
- Natural building
- Permaculture
