= Mike Oehler =

American environmentalist and author

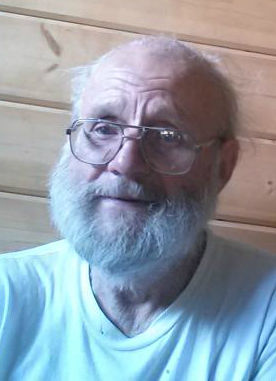
- Born: David Michael Oehler; January 2, 1938; Chicago, Illinois, U.S.
- Died: February 2, 2016 (aged 78); Boundary County, Idaho, U.S.
- Other names: Mountain Mike
- Occupation(s): Environmentalist, author, designer

David Michael Oehler (AY-lur; January 2, 1938 – February 2, 2016) was an American environmentalist and author. He was a proponent and designer of affordable and sustainable alternative forms of housing. He became well known for his appearance in episodes of the Louis Theroux BBC documentary series Weird Weekends (1998).

== Early life ==
David Michael Oehler was born in Chicago on January 2, 1938, the son of Polly and Chet Oehler. He grew up in nearby Wilmette and had three sisters named Patricia, Gretchen, and Sioux. He graduated from New Trier High School but dropped out of college to pursue his writing career, then served in the U.S. Army before working on fishing boats. He then worked in gold mines in Alaska, joined the U.S. Forest Service, cruised around Mexico, and finally ended up in San Francisco, where he embraced the hippy movement and lifestyle.

== Career ==
Oehler partook in the 1960s back-to-the-land movement. He lived on a 40-acre homestead in the Idaho mountains. He wrote numerous books and appeared as a university lecturer, as well as a TV and radio guest on topics related to self-sufficiency and housing.

In 1998, Oehler appeared in an episode of Louis Theroux's BBC documentary series Weird Weekends, in which Theroux visited Oehler's underground home in the mountains. Later that year, he appeared in the follow-up special episode "Weird Christmas", in which he and three others who had appeared in their episodes (a Christian fundamentalist, a porn star, and a ufologist) met up with Theroux in New York and engaged in various activities. The episode saw Oehler being taken by Theroux to a recording studio, where he recorded a song under the stage name of Mountain Mike.

== Death ==
On February 2, 2016, at the age of 78, Oehler died of natural causes at his home near Bonners Ferry in Boundary County, Idaho.

== Bibliography ==
- 1981: One Mexican Sunday (ISBN 978-0960446414)
- 1982: The $50 Dollars and Up Underground House Book (ISBN 978-0442273118)
- 1999: The Hippy Survival Guide to Y2K (ISBN 978-1879628175)
- 2007: The Earth-sheltered Solar Greenhouse Book: How to Build an Energy Free Year-round Greenhouse (ISBN 978-0960446407)

== See also ==
- Off-the-grid
- Permaculture
- Survivalism
