= Forager =

Person who collect edible plants or fungi for consumption

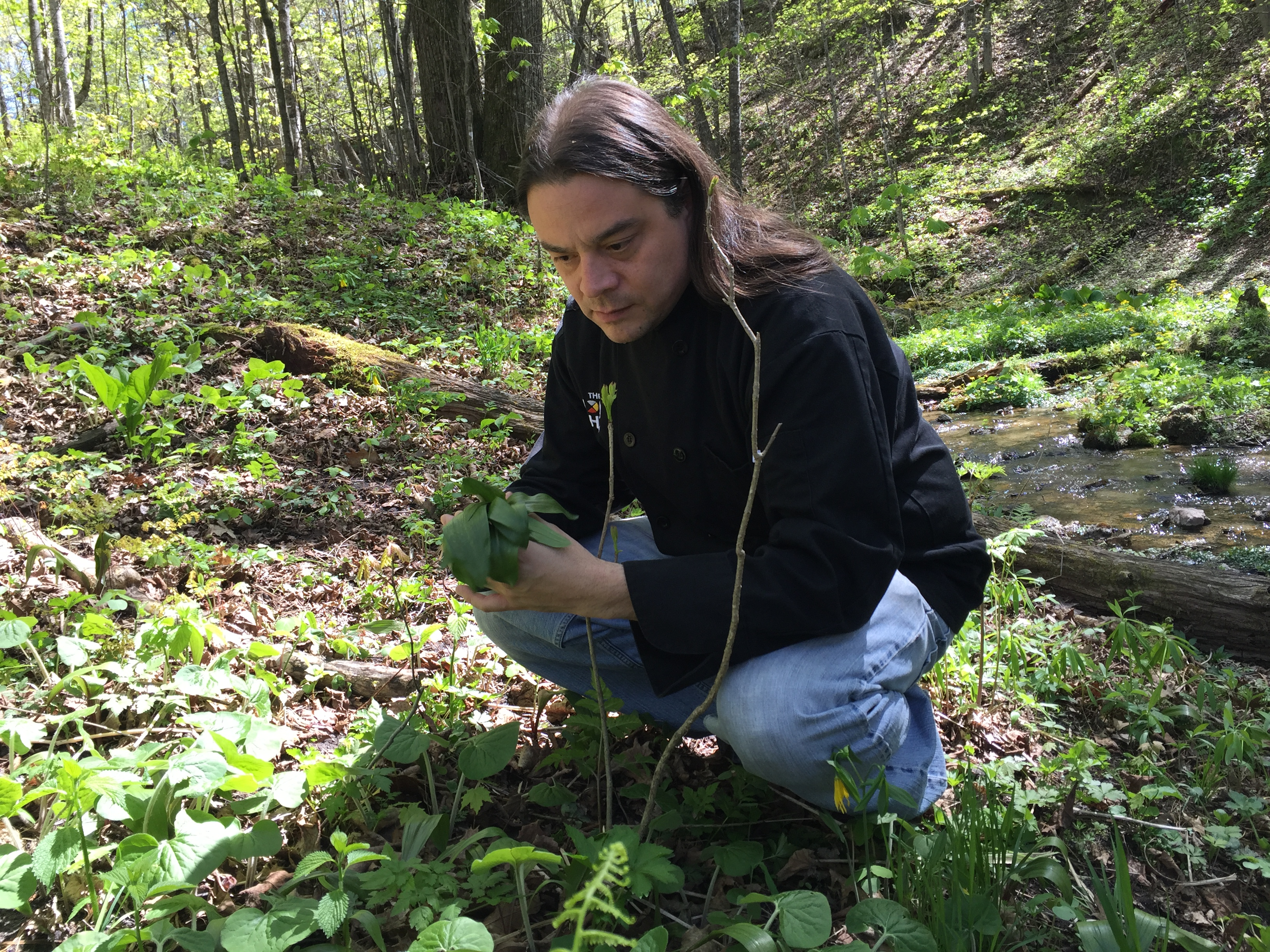
Sean Sherman harvesting ramps

A forager is a person who collects edible plants or fungi that grow without intentional cultivation. Foragers typically seek out herbs, fruits, roots, and mushrooms from nature to create dishes to eat. Professional chefs often forage or purchase from foragers in order to add these foods to restaurant menus.

While many foragers engage in the activity as a pastime, foraging can also be a free means of obtaining nutrient-dense food for low-income families, and becoming a significant part of a person's diet.

== Culture ==
Notable foragers include Euell Gibbons, "Wildman" Steve Brill, Sean Sherman, Alexis Nikole Nelson, Samuel Thayer, and chef Sami Tallberg.

Urban foragers may collect in city parks, private lands, and sidewalks. Urban foraging has gained popularity in the 21st century, as people share their knowledge, experiments, and research about local flora online.

== Health and safety ==
=== Misidentification ===
Many poisonous plants and mushrooms are toxic look-alikes of edible species. Misidentifying species can lead to the accidental ingestion of toxins, which can be fatal. Misidentification causes thousands of poisoning cases annually, which have been reported to poison centers and emergency departments. In the past decade, an increasing number of these cases has been attributed to use of artificial intelligence and smartphone applications that use the phones camera to identify plant and mushroom species. These programs can be inaccurate and are not considered a safe method of identification.

== See also ==
- Wildcrafting
- Ethnobotany
- Farm-to-table
- Food Not Lawns
- Herbal medicine
- List of forageable plants
- Rewilding (anarchism)
