= Peter Michael Bauer =

American environmentalist

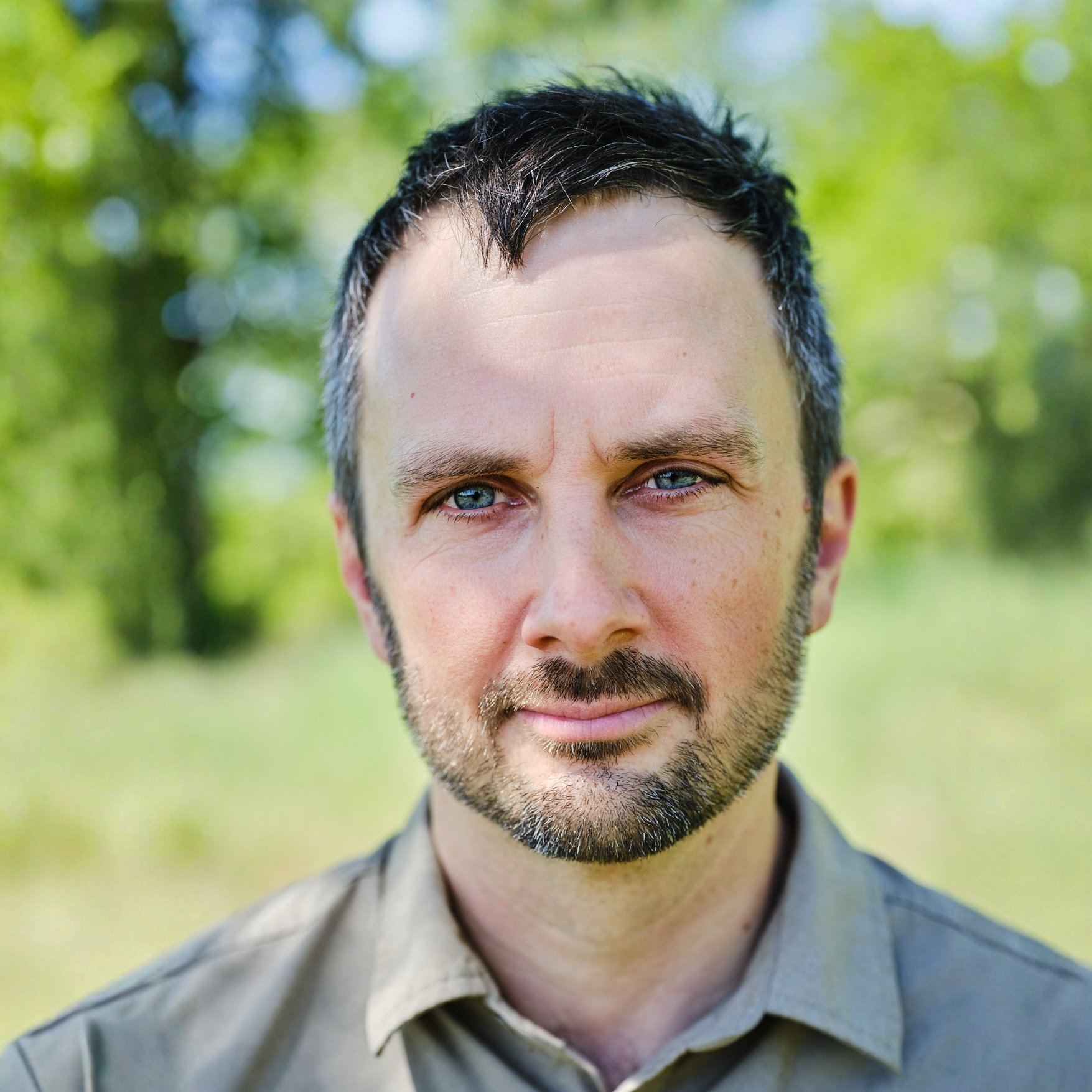
- Peter Michael Bauer 2025
- Born: 1982 (age 43–44)
- Citizenship: American
- Occupations: Environmentalist; Primitive skills educator; Rewilding advocate
- Known for: Rewild Portland; "Urban Scout"
- Movement: Rewilding
- Website: petermichaelbauer.com

Peter Michael Bauer (born 1982) is a Portland, Oregon-based environmental and primitive skills educator, rewilding advocate, and performer. Bauer is the founder of Rewild Portland. He is known for his performance persona "Urban Scout", through which he helped bring the rewilding movement to broader public attention in the United States during the 2000s.

== Early life ==
Bauer, a fourth-generation northeast Portland native, grew up in the suburbs of Portland. At the age of eleven, he earned his first Boy Scout merit badge for basketry.

At sixteen he and his friend, author Lisa Wells, dropped out of high school in 1998 and traveled to New Jersey to study under naturalist and survivalist Tom Brown, Jr.. Bauer has cited the novel Ishmael, by Daniel Quinn as an early influence to pursue what would become the rewilding movement.

In 2002, Bauer founded Mythmedia, a nonprofit dedicated to "creating cultural and environmental change through the arts." It functioned as a hybrid art collective, film forum, and community advocacy organization, running programs that included writing classes for homeless youth and a summer camp teaching wilderness and urban survival skills.

== Urban Scout ==
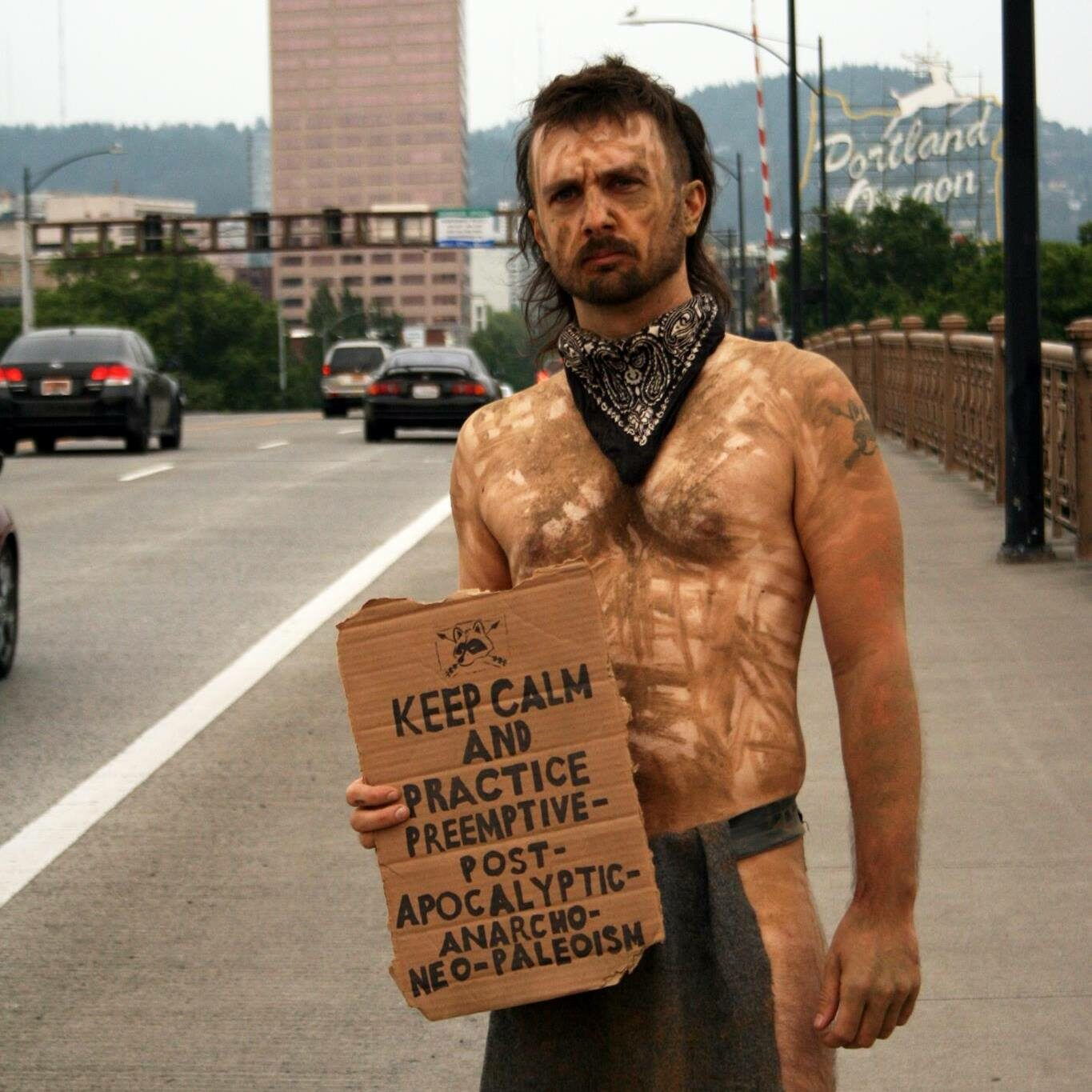
Urban Scout 2020

Bauer began appearing as Urban Scout in the 2003, dressed only in a covering of mud, soleless Adidas, and a rectangle of gray wool loincloth. He performed the character publicly throughout Portland, demonstrating primitive skills in Pioneer Courthouse Square, like lighting cigarettes with a bow-drill fire.

In the 2015 book, Pieces of Portland: An Inside Look at America’s Weirdest City, Bauer describes his long-term goal as living as closely as possible to a hunter-gatherer-gardener way of life and helping others do the same. For anyone who wants to begin rewilding, Bauer advises learning native plants, foraging and processing edible weeds, and studying a pre-agricultural way of life.

One reporter described Urban Scout as "a playful response to a real set of problems." Bauer also began going barefoot and fashioned what he called "Urban Scout Shoes" — soleless Adidas that let him walk barefoot while technically satisfying no-shoes policies.

Events organized under the persona included The Silent Spring Fling, the Nuclear Winter Formal (an annual "preemptive post-apocalyptic" dance party) and a summer survival camp covering fire-making, gas siphoning, lock picking, and urban foraging.

In 2006, Bauer launched the blog urbanscout.org.

== Rewild Portland ==
In 2009, Bauer founded the nonprofit Rewild Portland, which offers instruction in wild skills and ecological restoration for children and adults. The mission of the organization is "to foster cultural and environmental resilience through place-based arts, traditions, and technologies". Bauer says, "rewilding is about returning to a more wild and natural state".

The organization works with several Native groups in the Willamette Valley. Classes have covered basket-weaving using invasive species (such as English ivy and Himalayan blackberry), stone tool-making, archery, hide tanning, bow-making, herbal medicine, cooking roadkill, and urban foraging.

He learned to speak the Native trade language of his local region, Chinook Wawa. Bauer also leads an annual wild skills gathering workshop called "Echoes in Time". In 2010, he self-published his book Rewild or Die.

In Jessica Carew Kraft’s book Why We Need To Be Wild: One Woman’s Quest for Ancient Human Answers to 21st Century Problems, Kraft describes Bauer as "one of the most prominent popularizers of the craft in the rewilding scene today…"

In 2026, the peer-reviewed journal Hunter Gatherer Research (Liverpool University Press) published Bauer's "The human rewilding movement: Iterative application of hunter-gatherer studies at Rewild Portland." Delia Fian’s 2026 book, Foraged Basketry: Weaving with Wild and Invasive Plants features an interview with Bauer about his basket weaving history, techniques and use of invasive species and native plants.
