= International Herb Symposium =

Botanical conference held in Massachusetts, U.S.

The International Herb Symposium is a biannual conference held at Wheaton College in Norton, Massachusetts to discuss botanical medicine, herbal conservation and the survival of First World herbal traditions. This conference is one of the largest herb conferences held in the United States and the only worldwide herbal conference with an explicit international focus, including speakers from Africa, Tibet, Central and South America and American Indian tribes. During this conference, over 100 workshops are typically presented during a single weekend – ranging from indigenous traditional to scientific uses of botanicals. The conference is organized by Rosemary Gladstar and Sage Mountain Retreat Center and features speakers from all over the world.
