= Steven Brill =

Steven Brill may refer to:

- Steven Brill (filmmaker) (born 1962), American actor, director and screenwriter
- Steven Brill (journalist) (born 1950), American lawyer, journalist and entrepreneur
- "Wildman" Steve Brill (born 1949), American naturalist and author
