= Alexis Nikole Nelson =

American forager and internet personality

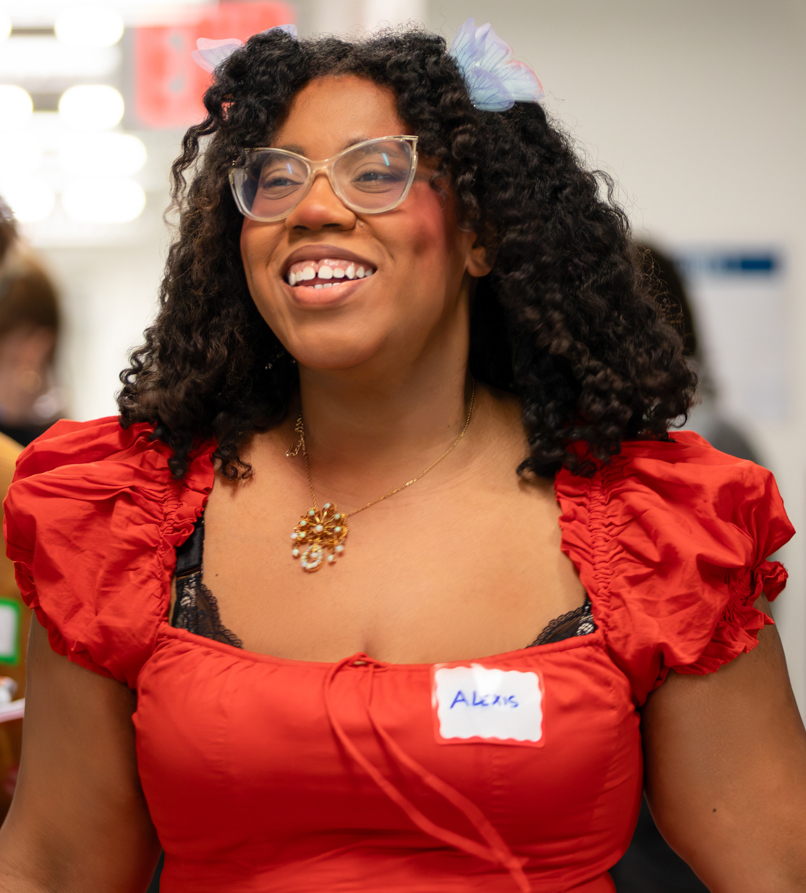
- Nelson speaking at Wikipedia Day 2026 in New York City
- Born: March 27, 1992 (age 34); Cincinnati, Ohio, US
- Education: Ohio State University
- Known for: Foraging, social media accounts
- Awards: James Beard Award (2022)

Instagram information
- Page: Alexis Nikole
- Years active: 2019–present
- Followers: 2.8 million

TikTok information
- Page: Alexis Nikole
- Years active: 2020–present
- Followers: 4.9 million

YouTube information
- Channel: BlackForager
- Years active: 2020–present
- Subscribers: 1.1 million
- Views: 123 million
- Last updated: June 1, 2026

Alexis Nikole Nelson (born March 27, 1992) is an American forager, cook, and internet personality. She is professionally known under the usernames alexisnikole on TikTok and BlackForager on Instagram and YouTube. On all platforms, she shares videos about foraging, cooking, and food history. In 2022, Nelson won the inaugural James Beard Award for Best Social Media Account.

== Early life and education ==
Alexis Nikole Nelson was born on March 27, 1992, and grew up in Cincinnati, Ohio. She is of Cape Verdean descent through her mother's side, and Haudenosaunee ancestry on her father's side. Her mother first showed her how to forage at the age of five by introducing her to onion grass. Nelson has described having a "fraught" relationship" with food while growing up.

She attended the New School Montessori and Walnut Hills High School, from which she graduated with honors in 2010. She graduated from the Ohio State University in 2015 with degrees in theater and environmental science. Nelson began actively foraging in 2015, as a cheap way to obtain food. She began by studying a book from Marie Viljoen. She is mentored by the author Samuel Thayer. She was also a standup comedian in her local area.

Nelson lives in Columbus, Ohio, with her partner and several pets. She practices a vegan diet.

== Social media ==
Nelson posts videos of her foraging finds on social media accounts. Her videos are informal and humorous, and express her experience with and knowledge of foraging. She has maintained the Instagram account "blackforager" since 2019, and created the TikTok page "alexisnikole" in 2020, followed the same year by the YouTube channel "BlackForager". Nelson's posts concern such topics as the Indigenous roots of foraging in America, the history of American foraging laws, and sustainable ways for her viewers to include wild plants and mushrooms in their diets, with a focus on vegan recipes. She discusses the cultural and historical context surrounding foraging, especially in Black and Indigenous communities. In most of her videos, she documents ingredients that she finds in the wild and then turns them into dishes using her own or adapted recipes. Many of her videos also include her singing. Her videos often end with the semi-serious warning "happy snacking, don't die". She has stated she takes pollution, including herbicides and car pollution, into consideration when choosing where to forage and avoids locations she knows to have heavy contamination.

Nelson's social media following expanded significantly in 2021, growing from fewer than 500,000 TikTok followers early in that year to 3.3 million followers by January 2022. By September 2021, she had resigned from her role as a social media manager to focus full-time on foraging content. Throughout 2021, she received national media attention from outlets that included The New York Times and Bon Appétit, alongside guest appearances on The Kelly Clarkson Show and The Drew Barrymore Show. She was also included in the Forbes 30 Under 30 list that year.

In April 2022, Nelson attended the 2022 TED conference in Vancouver, the first since the COVID-19 pandemic began. At the conference, she gave a TED Talk about her foraging work, and cooked sweet-and-salty seaweed chips using Vancouver-foraged bull kelp. In June 2022, she won the inaugural James Beard Award for Social Media Account. Her accounts at the time had a cumulative 4.8 million followers.

In January 2023 Nelson appeared on Jimmy Kimmel Live!. In 2023, Nelson joined the YouTube channel Crash Course, where she hosted a 15-episode series on botany. In December 2023, an episode of Eat This with Yara featuring Nelson titled "The Awful Truth About ‘No Trespassing’ Signs" won the Outstanding Lifestyle Program award at the 50th Annual Daytime Emmy Awards. In 2025, she was named to the Time 100 Creators list. In 2026, she gave a lecture at the Cleveland Museum of Natural History.

Nelson wrote the book Happy Snacking, Don't Die!, a cookbook that was initially intended to be released in 2023, but was eventually published by Simon & Schuster in September 2026. It received a starred review from Library Journal and was named one of the 12 most anticipated cookbooks of that fall by Eater. She went on a book tour for the book in late 2026, with stops including Seattle, Detroit, and Cleveland.

== Awards and recognition ==
- 2022 James Beard Foundation Award for Social Media Account
- 2025 Time 100 Creators
- 2025 Dr. Maria Montessori Ambassador Award from the American Montessori Society

== See also ==
- Ethnobotany
- Cape Verdean Americans
