= Wildcrafting =

Harvesting plants from their natural habitat

Wildcrafting (also known as foraging, especially in North America) is the practice of harvesting plants from their natural, or 'wild' habitat, primarily for food or medicinal purposes. It applies to uncultivated plants wherever they may be found, which can include both wilderness areas and urban foraging. Ethical considerations are often involved, such as protecting endangered species, potential for depletion of commonly held resources, and in the context of private property, preventing theft of valuable plants, for example, ginseng.

When wildcrafting is done sustainably and with proper respect, generally only the fruit, flowers or branches from plants are taken and the living plant is left, or if it is necessary to take the whole plant, seeds of the plant are placed in the empty hole from which the plant was taken. Care is taken to remove only a few plants, flowers, or branches, so plenty remains to continue the supply. The Association of Foragers believes that foraging by people plays an increasingly important role supporting, promoting and defending the health of all plants, fungi, algae, animals (including humans) and the habitats/environments in which they exist. The Plants for a Future database lists 7,000 plants with edible, medicinal or other uses. In the United States, the mission of United Plant Savers is to protect native medicinal plants of the U.S. and Canada (such as goldenseal) and their native habitat while ensuring an abundant renewable supply of medicinal plants for generations to come.

Four states and five national forests in the U.S. actively manage the wild harvesting of ginseng to ensure sustainability of wild populations. In Europe, non-wood forest products (e.g., forest fruits, mushroom, cork, pine kernels, acorns, medicinal herbs, essential oils, chestnuts, etc.) can be significant in the bioeconomy, especially in regions where wood is not the most profitable product. These were examined during a four-year study called The StarTree Project which assessed the wildcrafting of non-timber forest products across 14 regions of Europe to explore best practice and commercial opportunities.

== Plants and fungus that are wildcrafted ==
Two of the most common types of plants and fungus that are wildcrafted are truffles and huckleberries. Truffles are a fungus which forms a complex life cycle with its host tree, creating a varied reproduction cycle that limits its potential to be grown using traditional agriculture. Huckleberries have a preference for acidic soils, specific enough to make large scale farming of the plant difficult. Attempts at cultivating these plants and fungi involve encouraging their growth in various locations to promote increased production.

== Environmental impact ==
Although foraging in small amounts for personal use has little impact on nonendangered populations of plants and fungi, once a species attracts widespread commercial interest it can quickly come under pressure if sustainable harvesting and management procedures are not followed. A case in point is Arnica, a medicinal species made into homeopathic remedies and highly popular first aid creams for bumps and bruises. It is now under strict protection and is included in the IUCN Red List of Threatened Species and in the Red Data Books and Red Data Lists of many European countries. Despite the loss of habitats, Arnica is mainly harvested from the wild. Dried flowers traded annually in Europe are estimated to be around 50 tonnes. The collection of Arnica for medicinal purposes has also caused disappearance or reduction in the size of several European populations. The pressure on natural sources of this plant is alleviated by a suitable use of Arnica supply in the European region, where flower heads are harvested.

== See also ==
- Agroforestry
- Biomass (ecology)
- Biomass
- Bioproducts
- Bushtucker
- Forest gardening
- Hunter-gatherer
- Non-timber forest product
- World Forestry Congress
