= Lisa Wells =

Lisa Wells may refer to:

- Lisa Wells (astronomer)
- Lisa Wells (musician), member of the American band The Honeymoon Killers
- Lisa Wells (writer), American poet and essayist

== See also ==
- Alisa Wells, American photographer
