= Samuel Thayer =

Samuel Thayer may refer to:

- Samuel R. Thayer (1837–1909), American attorney and diplomat
- Samuel J. F. Thayer (1842–1893), American architect
- Samuel Thayer (author), American author and wild plant forager
