= Pinella =

Restaurant in Turku, Finland

Coordinates: 60°27′05″N 022°16′30″E

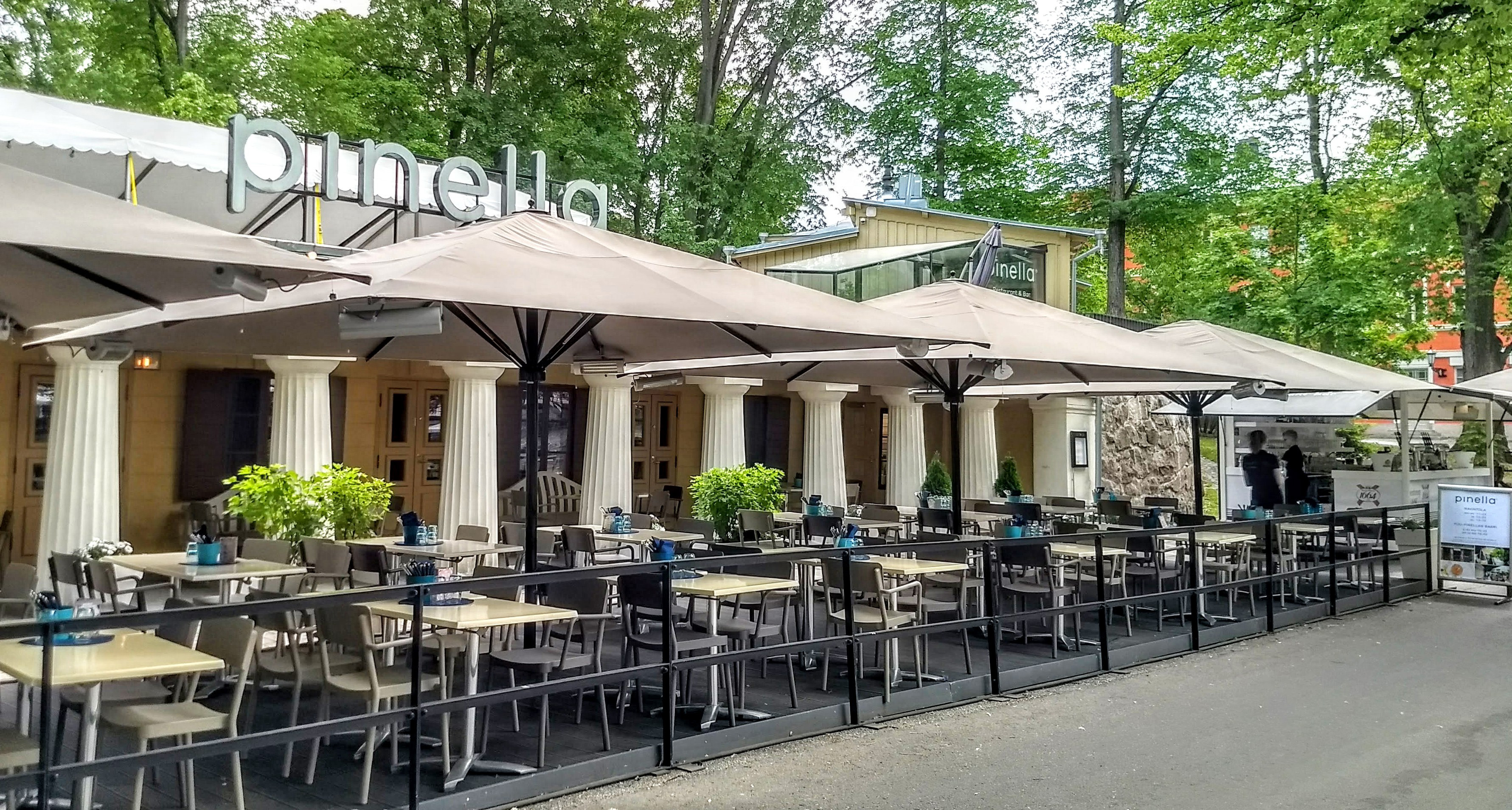
The terrace of restaurant Pinella on the shore of the River Aura in Turku.

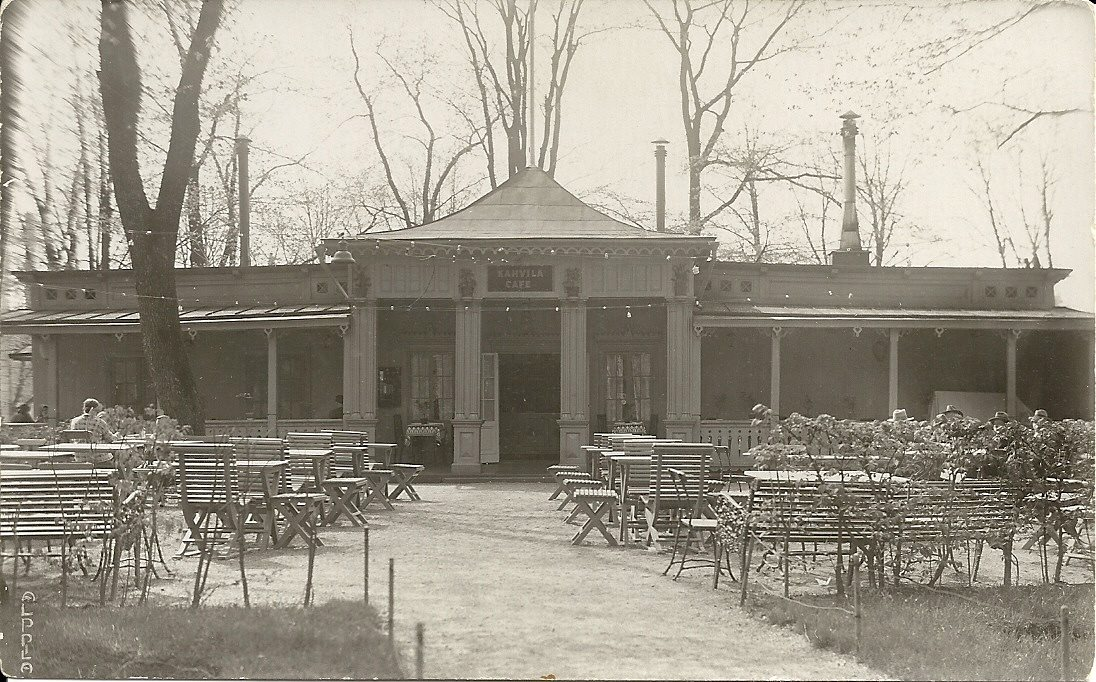
Pinella in 1932.

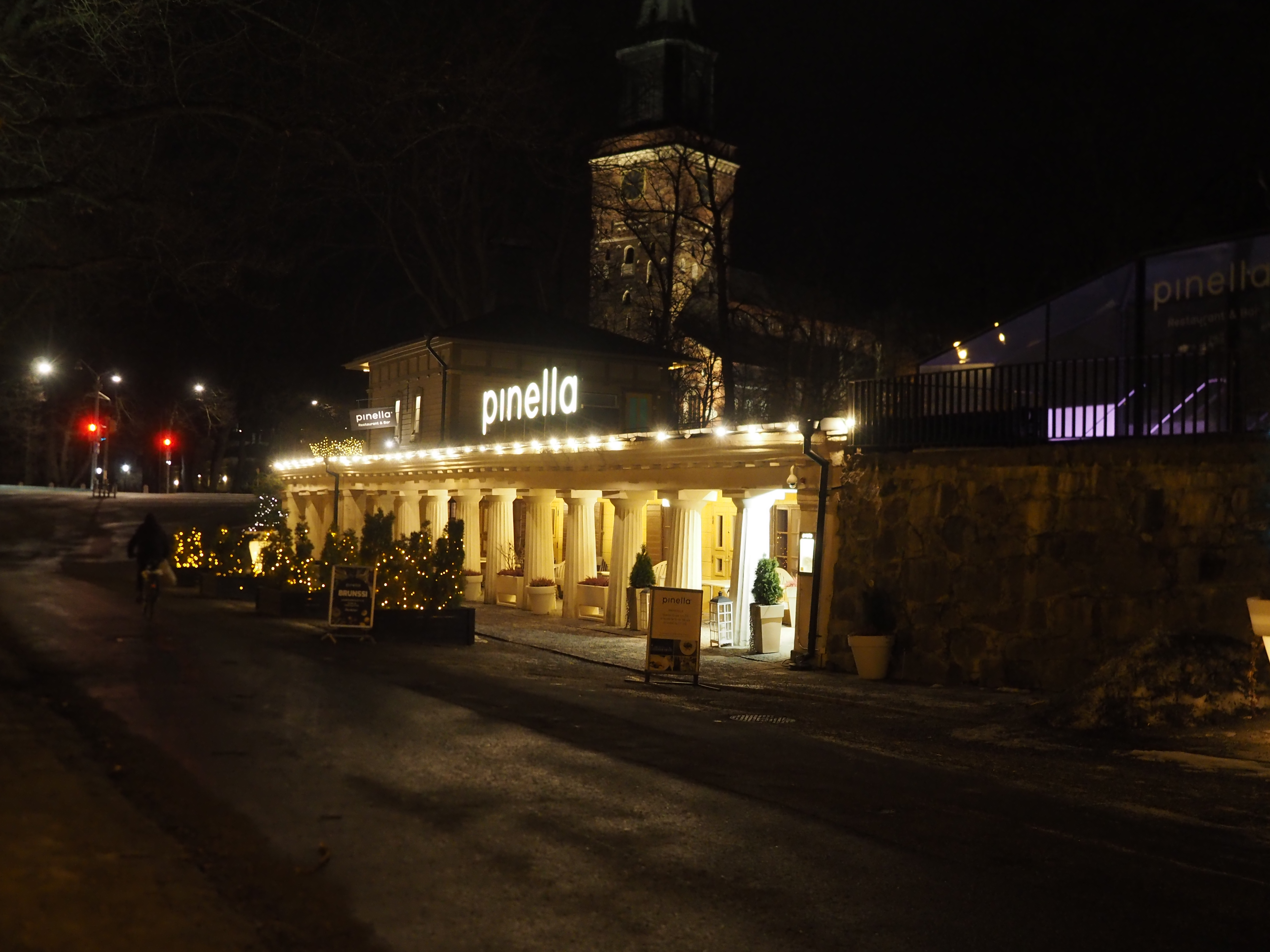
Pinella at night time.

Pinella was a restaurant in the Porthaninpuisto park in central Turku, Finland, next to the Turku Cathedral. The restaurant was run by Sunborn Group. Pinella was one of the oldest restaurants in Finland in terms of length of operation.

In 1848, Nils Henrik Pinello from Turku sought permission to construct a pavilion in the middle of the Porthaninpuisto park. The permission was granted and the pavilion was constructed in the place where the statue of Henrik Gabriel Porthan is currently located. Because of the statue, the pavilion was moved closed to the River Aura, for which the city of Turku gave Pinello a grant of 150 roubles. In the same year, the Doric order columns designed by Per Johan Gylich in 1836 were expanded. In 1862 Nils Pinello gave the pavilion away to his son Julius Pinello, after which it has had several owners.

The restaurant was known as the bohemian meeting place of the culture and art circles, famous visitors in the 19th century have included Elias Lönnrot, J. L. Runeberg and Sakari Topelius.

In 1919, prohibition starved off many restaurants, but Pinella acted as an alcohol store during the time. Alcohol was hidden in the columns among other places. In 1937 a Gulf service station was opened next to the restaurant and stayed there until the late 1970s. The Turku Artists' Association kept ownership of Pinella from the early 1950s to the late 1960s. Pinella was known once again as the meeting place of the bohemian and the artists.

In 1973, Pinella was renovated and opened the first street-side terrace with an alcohol sale licence in Finland next to the river shore. From 2004 to 2011 Pinella was disused and its condition worsened. The place was thoroughly renovated. As archaeologists investigated the bottom floor it became apparent that there had been a public toilet at the back of the columns in the 19th century. During the renovation the restaurant's original tapestries from the 19th century were also found.

Erik Mansikka, who won the "Vuoden kokki" ("Chef of the year") award in 2013, has been working as a chef in Pinella in the early 2010s. In summer 2018, Sami Tallberg has also worked as a chef in the Pinella kitchen.

Restaurant Pinella closed down on 25 September 2021.
