= Jessica Carew Kraft =

American writer

- Born: May 28, 1978 (age 48); Minneapolis, Minnesota, U.S.
- Occupation: Journalist
- Children: 2
- Website: jessicacarewkraft.com

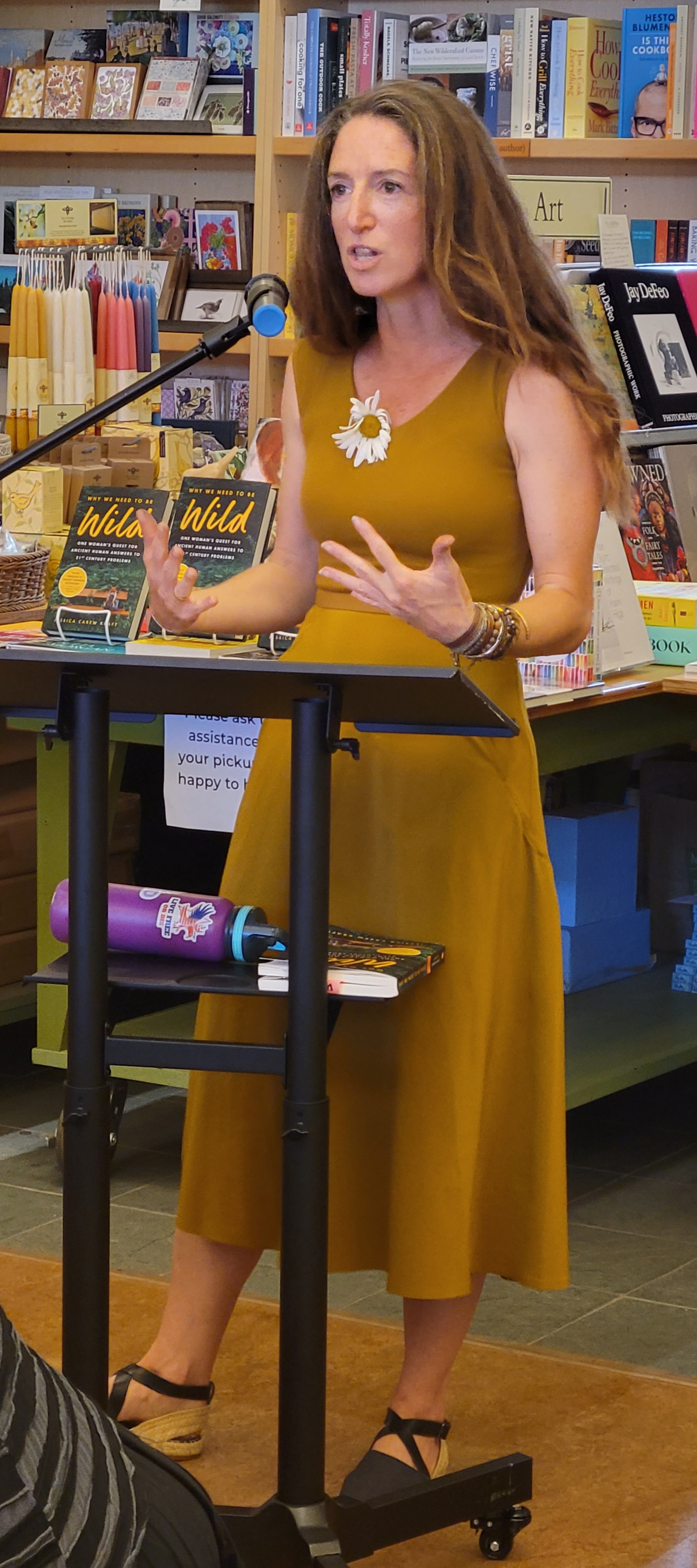
Jessica Carew Kraft speaking at Mrs. Dalloway's book store in Berkeley, California on August 27, 2023.

Jessica Carew Kraft is an American writer, journalist, and anthropologist known for her work exploring the intersection of modern life and ancestral human practices. She is the author of Why We Need To Be Wild: One Woman’s Quest for Ancient Human Answers to 21st Century Problems, a first-person account of learning ancestral skills and the anti-civilization rewilding movement.

Her reporting on health, culture, and education has appeared in The New York Times, The Atlantic, Forbes, KQED, Christian Science Monitor, ARTNews, YOGA Magazine, and NBC News Online.

== Early life and education ==
Kraft was born in Minneapolis, Minnesota and grew up in the American Midwest. Kraft is the great-grand-niece of H. S. Kraft, a blacklisted screenwriter and playwright.

She earned a bachelor's degree in sociology and anthropology from Swarthmore College, a master's degree in cultural anthropology from Yale University, and a master's from The University of London’s Consortium program.

== Journalism ==
Kraft has written for publications including The New York Times, The Atlantic, Forbes, Christian Science Monitor, NBC News online, KQED, and other publications. She is a regular contributor to Proto.Life.

Her 2014 article on a racial controversy in American college debate competitions has been widely cited. She has written about unjust genetic testing policy in the Medi-Cal system, Tunisia’s post-revolutionary arts scene, and emerging mindful tech designers at Stanford. She frequently writes about ecological issues and sustainability. Kraft also published graphic memoir essays about motherhood in Motherwell Magazine, Hip Mama, and Mutha Magazine.

== Books ==
Kraft is the author of Why We Need To Be Wild: One Woman’s Quest for Ancient Human Answers to 21st Century Problems. The book was called "A great read for naturalists, those interest in rewilding, survivalists, and anyone searching for a different way of life" by Booklist, and a "spiritual field guide" by Alta Magazine. It was chosen as an August 2023 selection on Next Big Idea and excerpted in Big Think. The author has been profiled in several publications that depict her use of ancestral skills in urban contexts.
