= Food Not Lawns =

Social movement emphasizing organic gardens

Food Not Lawns is a de-centralized social movement focused on replacing urban lawns with food-producing organic gardens. The first group to use the name "Food Not Lawns" was founded in Eugene, Oregon in 1999 by Tobias Policha, Nick Routledge, and Heather Jo Flores. In 2006, Flores published the book Food Not Lawns: How to Turn Your Yard into a Garden and Your Neighborhood into a Community. A self-described "avant-gardening collective", FNL's basic premise was to garner surplus resources, whether food, seeds, plants, tools, garden space, publications, or volunteer time, and channel them toward building better food security for the community at hand.

Born of Eugene's radical political organizing community in the late 1990s, Food Not Lawns was founded in 1999 by Heather Jo Flores and colleagues of the Eugene Food Not Bombs chapter. Food Not Bombs, a free food-sharing collective, has a common concern with food justice issues, and a similar stewardship and democratic approach. Neither Food Not Lawns nor Food Not Bombs chapters answer to a central decision-making body. Rather, they are examples of movements that operate on a premise of anarchism, autonomy and self-organization. Anyone is free to start a Food Not Lawns group, and resources are provided through an interconnected network.

Food Not Lawns chapters typically organize local seed swap events, build community gardens, generate web or print publications, and host work parties to help community members turn their lawns into gardens.

According to the Food Not Lawns International Website, Food Not Lawns currently has more than 50 chapters worldwide. Similar movements have also started up, with names including Grow Food Not Lawns and Plant Food Not Lawns; merchandise can be found bearing any of the three slogans.
