= Rosemary Gladstar =

American herbalist

Rosemary Gladstar is an American herbalist, author and educator and known as "the godmother of modern herbalism."

== Biography ==
Gladstar began her work in herbalism in California. In 1978, Gladstar founded the California School of Herbal Studies in Forestville, California, the oldest running herb school in the United States. In the 1980s, Gladstar co-founded the New England Women's Herbal Conference.

She moved to Vermont in 1987 and co-founded Sage Mountain Herbal Retreat Center and Botanical Sanctuary, a 550-acre botanical preserve in central Vermont. In the 2020s, it was incorporated into a 501(c)(3) nonprofit organization and renamed as Sage Mountain Botanical Sanctuary.

In the 1990s, Gladstar started a home study herbal course. The course was later developed into the online course, Science and Art of Herbalism, which hundreds of students studied globally. Gladstar helped found the Northeast Herb Association in 1991.

In 1994, Gladstar founded United Plant Savers out of concern over the ecological sustainability of the herb trade; she serves as the Founding President of the Board of Directors of United Plant Savers. The organization has received several awards including the inaugural Steven Foster Award for Conservation and Sustainability from the American Botanical Council in 2022.

In 1998, Gladstar founded the International Herb Symposium. It is a biennial event for herbalists from across the globe to exchange information on herbs. The 16th International Herb Symposium was held in 2023.

Gladstar is the author of several books as listed below. She has taught about herbs extensively throughout the U.S. and speaks widely at herbal conferences including the Southwest Conference, Free Herbalism Project, Medicines from the Earth, the Green Nations Gathering and Breitenbush. She also leads herbal travel adventures in various parts of the world.

Gladstar is a faculty member of Association for the Advancement of Restorative Medicine.

In recognition of her contributions to natural medicine as an herbalist, author and educator, she received an honorary Doctor of Laws degree (LL D) from the National University of Natural Medicine in 2017.

== Books ==
- Gladstar, Rosemary. (2019) Fire Cider!: 101 Zesty Recipes for Health-Boosting Remedies Made with Apple Cider Vinegar. Storey Publishing, LLC. ISBN 978-1635861808
- Gladstar, Rosemary. (2017) Rosemary Gladstar's Herbal Healing for Men: Remedies and Recipes for Circulation Support, Heart Health, Vitality, Prostate Health, Anxiety Relief, Longevity, Virility, Energy & Endurance. Storey Publishing, LLC. ISBN 978-1612124773
- Gladstar, Rosemary. (2015) Herbs for Children's Health: How to Make and Use Gentle Herbal Remedies for Soothing Common Ailments. Storey Publishing.
- Gladstar, Rosemary. (2014) Herbs for Long-Lasting Health: How to Make and Use Herbal Remedies for Lifelong Vitality. Storey Publishing, LLC.
- Gladstar, Rosemary. (2014) Herbs for Natural Beauty: Create Your Own Herbal Shampoos, Cleansers, Creams, Bath Blends, and More. Storey Publishing, LLC. ISBN 978-1612124735
- Gladstar, Rosemary. (2014) Herbs for Common Ailments: How to Make and Use Herbal Remedies for Home Health Care. Storey Publishing, LLC. ISBN 978-1612124315
- Gladstar, Rosemary. (2014) Herbs for Stress & Anxiety: How to Make and Use Herbal Remedies to Strengthen the Nervous System. Storey Publishing, LLC. ISBN 978-1612124292
- Gladstar, Rosemary. (2014) Herbs for Long-Lasting Health: How to Make and Use Herbal Remedies for Lifelong Vitality. Storey Publishing, LLC. ISBN 978-1612124711
- Gladstar, Rosemary. (2012) Rosemary Gladstar's Medicinal Herbs: A Beginner's Guide: 33 Healing Herbs to Know, Grow, and Use. Storey Publishing, LLC. ISBN 978-1612120058
- Gladstar, Rosemary. (2008) Rosemary Gladstar's Herbal Recipes for Vibrant Health: 175 Teas, Tonics, Oils, Salves, Tinctures, and Other Natural Remedies for the Entire Family. Storey Publishing, LLC. ISBN 978-1603420785
- Gladstar, Rosemary. (2001) Rosemary Gladstar's family herbal a guide to living life with energy, health, and vitality. North Adams, Mass. : Storey Books, c2001.vii, 400 p. : ill. (some col.); 19 cm.
- Hirsch, Pamela and Gladstar, Rosemary. (2000) Planting the future : saving our medicinal herbs / edited by Rosemary Gladstar and Pamela Hirsch.Rochester, Vt. : Healing Arts Press, c2000.x, 310 p., [8] p. of plates : ill. (some col.); 26 cm.
- Gladstar, Rosemary. (1993) Herbal Healing for Women. Atria. ISBN 978-0671767679

“Rosemary Gladstar's Herbal Recipes for Vibrant Health” has been translated into German and Japanese.
