= United Plant Savers =

United Plant Savers is a nonprofit organization based in Rutland, OH on 379-acre Botanical Sanctuary whose goal is to promote the preservation of native North American medicinal plants. The group maintains an "At Risk" list of plants that are considered scarce in the wild in North America, such as ginseng, goldenseal and slippery elm. The organization was founded by Rosemary Gladstar and a number of other horticulturists. The organization encourages the creation of private land "botanical sanctuaries" across the country where at risk plants can be preserved and propagated.
