= "Wildman" Steve Brill =

American naturalist

Steve Brill
- Born: March 10, 1949 (age 77); New York City
- Other name: Wildman
- Occupations: Naturalist, environmental educator, author
- Known for: New York City park forager
- Website: www.wildmanstevebrill.com

Steve "Wildman" Brill (born March 10, 1949) is an American forager, naturalist, environmental educator and author. He gained notoriety in 1986, when he was arrested in New York City's Central Park for eating a dandelion.

== Early life and career ==
Brill was born to a Jewish family and identifies as culturally Jewish. His grandmother taught him cooking when he was a child. His family often went berry picking and foraging. Brill was a pre-med student at George Washington University. He later changed his major to psychology, but learned botany, foraging, and gourmet vegan cooking on his own, after college.

== Career ==
Brill has been taking people on nature walks in New York's Central Park, and parks throughout the Greater NY area, since 1982. Brill says his tours had the approval of the parks department until they began refusing to issue him a weed-picking permit in 1983. He gained notoriety in 1986 when he was arrested by two undercover park rangers and charged with criminal mischief after allegedly eating a dandelion he had picked in New York's Central Park. Brill was released with a "desk-appearance ticket" pending trial. According to Brill, the New York City Parks Department "dropped the charges and hired me to lead the same tours I was busted for" until a change in park administration in 1990.

In 1994, Brill published his book: Identifying and Harvesting Edible and Medicinal Plants in Wild (and Not So Wild) Places which explains how to identify and forage for edible or medicinal plants. In 2001, Brill published The Wild Vegetarian Cookbook: A Forager's Culinary Guide; a 500 recipe wild and natural foods cookbook. In 2008, he released his self-published "Shoots and Greens of Early Spring in Northeastern North America, and in 2014, he released his self-published "Foraging with Kids."

In 2011, Brill released an iPhone app called Wild Edibles Forage with Winterroot, which gives information on "250 common North American plants". They also created an Android version. Both applications feature Brill's edible plant photos, his botanical illustrations, and hundreds of his vegan whole-foods recipes.

Brill is reported to be the foremost foraging expert in the Northeast and works with nature centers, schools, day camps, libraries, parks departments, land trusts, nature centers, museums, health food stores, farmer's markets, teaching farms, and other organizations, to educate the public on foraging in the Northeastern US. Many of his tours are co-led by his foraging expert daughter, Violet Brill (born 2004).

Steve Brill is also an artist who creates sculptures and paintings of plants which can be seen in his app and books.
