= Lisa Wells (writer) =

American fiction writer

- Education: University of Iowa
- Writing career
- Genres: Nonfiction, poetry
- Website: www.lisawellswriter.com

Lisa Wells (born 1982) is an American writer. She is the author of The Fix, a poetry collection, and Believers, a nonfiction book.

== Career ==
=== The Fix ===
Wells' poetry collection The Fix was published in 2018 by the University of Iowa Press and received the Iowa Poetry Prize. Publishers Weekly gave it a starred review, writing: "Line by line, Wells delivers a brilliant, taut, terrifying debut that renders the parts of the inner and outer world for which there is no real cure". Guernica wrote: "Wells shies away neither from the bitterness of bewilderment nor the sorrow of reaching beyond one’s own invulnerability. Rather than positing a static sense of serenity, The Fix thrives on this bone-deep distress".

She has said that she wrote most of the book during her divorce. She told The Rumpus: "When I was writing that book, the gap between the false self I used to negotiate the world and my inner life became too big; it was untenable. The book wound up being a kind of attempt to integrate those selves. It felt pretty violent at times".

=== Believers ===
Wells' first nonfiction book, Believers: Making a Life at the End of the World, was published in 2021 by Farrar, Straus and Giroux. An exploration of resilience in the face of climate change, it received positive reviews.

Kirkus Reviews wrote that Wells "melds memoir, history, psychology, and philosophy" and called the book "An urgent message gently conveyed". Booklist wrote: "The resulting chronicle of environmental crises and the often radical actions some are taking to combat them is freshly informative and thought-provoking".

The New York Times wrote: "Wells’s final request, that we learn to work cooperatively and live in the loving embrace of true communities, tells only part of the story. Nature is the embrace, and if Wells digs in deeply enough wherever she is standing, she will find that nature’s long arms have always been twined through and around her".

In an interview with Oregon Public Broadcasting, Wells said: "A lot of what I’ve been saying gets at this idea of a crisis of narrative; the stories we inherited not only aren’t serving us in this crisis moment, but they may be brought us to this brink. So faith or the idea of serving something greater, even if you don’t mean that in religious terms, even if you just mean the idea of future generations of plants or animals, I think can be a sustaining force when you’re up against things that are so overwhelming and forces that are ultimately outside of your total control. In terms of the Christian terms that show up again and again in the book, I’m not religious, I wasn’t raised religious, but I am living in a country where those metaphors were in the groundwater".

In 2022, Believers was a finalist for the PEN/E. O. Wilson Literary Science Writing Award.

== Bibliography ==
- The Fix (University of Iowa Press, 2018)
- Believers: Making a Life at the End of the World (Farrar, Straus and Giroux, 2021)
