= Urban foraging =

Urban foraging is foraging that takes place in an urban or peri-urban setting. This is a multifaceted term which covers practices that have likely been common in urban areas since they were first formed and continues to encompass practices by a wide variety of people in settings all over the world. People who practice urban foraging include “rich and poor alike, employed and unemployed, literate and illiterate, migrants and long-term residents, with motivations and practices of individual foragers varying in time and place”. Given the diverse contexts and histories of urban foraging practices, a concise explanation of the practice is difficult.

== History of term ==
The first use of the term “urban foraging” is difficult to place. Humans are best known to have foraged as hunter gatherers, but foraging has remained a large part of human sustenance across the world’s many communities: through transitions to farming settlements, providing for needs alongside agriculture, and more recently through industrialisation and rural-urban migrations.

While there is exploration into the practices of gathering food resources in urban settings, in both global north and global south contexts, the term urban foraging is rarely or disparately used. A variety of terminology is commonly used to discuss similar and overlapping practices to urban foraging, including “urban gathering”, “urban collection” and “the use of urban commons”.

In popular society, the term appeared to gain notoriety in the late 1900s through the practice of foraging in urban contexts by public figures such as Steve “Wildman” Brill. More recently, "urban foraging" has begun to sprout across popular media: in books such as John Rensten’s “The Edible City” or “The Forager’s Calendar” by John Wright; in travel articles such as by National Geographic; and foraging tours.

Within the current academic literature on urban foraging most authors use a similar definition which can be exemplified with definition used by Shackleton and colleagues: “urban foraging as the practice of harvesting or gathering raw biological resources (fungi, plants, parts of plants, invertebrate and vertebrate animals, and fish) within urban and peri-urban settings primarily for direct consumption, decoration, crafts, barter, or small-scale sale.”

== Motivations ==
Motivations for urban foraging can be classified into three overlapping types of benefits: material; social/emotional; and political. Material benefits are generally centered around the fact that urban foraging is a manner to access nutrition without having to pay for it. Documented material motivations include: achieving food sovereignty; supplementing diet and nutrition; medicinal uses; alleviating poverty; a coping strategy or safety net during difficult times.

Socially, many people also point to urban foraging as a process deepening relationships with fellow foragers, local communities, other species and one's natural environments. People also use the practice as a manner to support their identity and cultures (e.g. to gather plants for ceremonial and spiritual practices). Modern trends towards foraging might also link to desires to remember lost wisdom, reclaim indigenous knowledge and explore decoloniality through this practice. Others, both migrants and people with long-standing connections to a place, have mentioned that the practice can help build a sense of place or belonging.

Especially in Western contexts, urban foraging practices have been politicized primarily for their ability to provide nutrition outside of consumerist and capitalist systems. Urban foraging is practiced by some freegans, people who try to consume as little as possible and limit their engagement in the conventional economy. In this context, urban foraging can provide one source of nutrition and raw material which may be done alongside other practices like dumpster diving. Some have used the incompatibility of private land ownership and urban foraging to promote a distinct commons-based approach to green and edible cities. They emphasize how urban foraging is often at odds with existing private property regimes because it includes taking resources from privately owned land or public land where resource extraction is not allowed.

== Opposition ==
Despite its benefits, urban foraging is often seen as undesirable by institutions and the public. Much of this is due to the classist and colonialist associations that were tied to foragers. It was only the economically disadvantaged or the underdeveloped who would engage in foraging, either out of need or tradition, hence a stigma was created. Alongside these cultural narratives, governmental or municipal institutions often play a key role in the disincentivisation of these practices, such as by planting non-edible plants and fruitless trees, removing traditional foraging sites and through making the collection of wild plants illegal. These restrictions affect public and common land. Foraging on private land suffers from harsher restrictions, often requiring permission from the land owner and is hence generally more difficult to perform. The ongoing privitisation of public and common land in cities hence presents a challenge for urban foraging as a practice going forward.

=== Steve Brill Case ===
One famous example of institutional foraging pushback involved the Steve "Wildman" Brill, a self-taught forager from New York City who has been encouraging urban foraging for the past few decades. In 1986, while giving a park foraging tour to a class of ecology students, Brill was arrested by uniformed park rangers. Two undercover rangers who were on the tour had called them as backup, after taking photos of Steve gathering and eating wild plants, as well as sharing this knowledge with the tourists.
