= Sami Tallberg =

Finnish chef, food writer

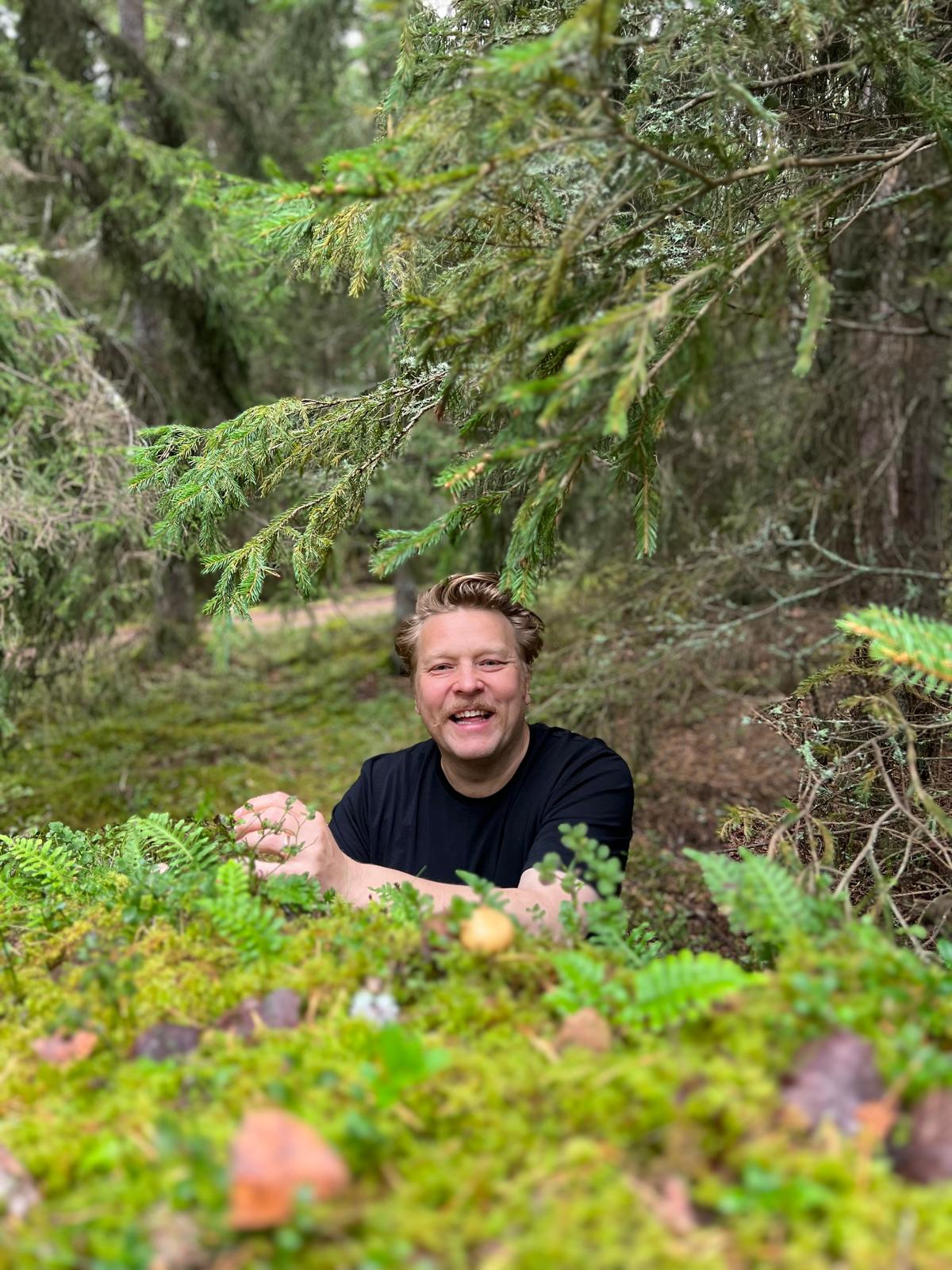
- Born: 7 November 1976 (age 49)
- Occupations: Chef, food writer and wild food activist
- Years active: 1997-present

Sami Tallberg (born 7 November 1976) is a Finnish chef and food writer. He is known for his advocacy of wild food and mushrooms.

== Education ==
Tallberg studied at Perho Helsinki Culinary School to become a restaurant chef from 1994 to 1997. He completed his Head Chef Degree in 2002 at Haaga-Helia University.

== Career in restaurants ==
Tallberg began his restaurant career at The Ivy in London where he worked as a chef from 1997 to 1999, learning from Mark Hix. His first job as a head chef was in London at The Rivington Grill, a restaurant and a deli, where he worked from 2002 until 2005. At the Rivington he gained experience working with the owners Mark Hix, Des McDonald, and Ratnesh Bagdai, and first developed an interest in wild food through his work with wild food expert and author Miles Irving.

In 2005 Tallberg started as executive chef for the Lloyds TSB Commercial Finance/Compass Group being in charge of the directors’ dining and events at the headquarters. Tallberg was also responsible for the wine list, leading to his interest in bio-organic wines.

Tallberg returned to Finland in 2008 to work as an executive chef for the restaurant Carelia in Helsinki.

After Carelia in 2011 he moved on to launch the five-star-hotel Hotel Kämp's new restaurant Kämp Signe, which specialized in Nordic wild food. At the same time he also worked at Tertin kartano mansion during the summer seasons of 2010 to 2012, developing their menu and recipes as well as training the staff in tending the restaurant's garden and foraging.

Tallberg was a head chef for NOMAD - a street food concept launched at the FLOW Festival in Helsinki in August 2013. He was also in charge of vegetarian and vegan restaurant Cargo Helsinki's concept, menu and recipes since early 2016.

Between 2016 and 2022 Tallberg worked as a concept and menu designer as well as an executive chef at Hotel Punkaharju, Finland. During 2022 Tallberg moved on to run his own concept restaurant ST X FDS in collaboration with Finnish Design Shop in Turku, Finland. In 2023 and 2024 Tallberg was in charge of Ateljé Sami Tallberg X Söderlångvik, a renovation and consulting project created for Konstsamfundet and Villa Söderlångvik.

In 2025 he worked with Billnäs Gård Livsakademi to serve private customers.

In Ateljé Sami Tallberg in Ruissalo, Tallberg runs dining, foraging and cooking courses since 2021.

== Career as a wild food expert and activist ==
Since 2009 Tallberg has been an expert and consultant in Finnish wild food and foraging, specializing in Nordic cuisine, biohacker-proof food as well as new wave vegan food. He holds lectures, food talks, workshops and courses throughout the year.

His expertise spans from urban areas in the UK and Finland to the Boreal forest zone (Taiga). In 2022 Tallberg expanded to fynbos vegetation forming a base camp in Cape Town area. In his work Tallberg regularly uses 81 edible mushrooms and 128 wild plants, with an interest in recipes, nutritional science, botany, and the history of botany.

One of his collaborations has taken him to plan and produce each Upgraded Dinner held for Biohacker Summits during 2015–2024.

Tallberg has published several cook books, the most notable being the bestseller The Forager's Cookbook, first published in 2011 (13th edition in 2025).

Tallberg appeared on the BBC in 2024, discussing wild food and foraging: Into the wild: 'Everyman's right' to forage in Finland.

== Collaborations with artists ==
In 2023 Tallberg accompanied filmmaker Lotta Petronella and musician Lau Nau in Helsinki Biennial to create a multisensory art experience Materia Medica of Islands. The performance included 15 edible plants from the island served on-site by Tallberg.

Fungi DNA was a two-night pop-up restaurant serving wild food where Tallberg paired up with Swedish designer Martin Bergström.

Since 2022, Tallberg has been collaborating with the Saari Residence, maintained by Kone Foundation, working as an inhouse chef.

== Awards and honours ==
- Finland Prize 2012 - For developing a new and unique style of Finnish food through using ingredients of a wild nature (Finland Prize is awarded by Minister of Culture and Education in recognition of a significant career in arts, an exceptional artistic achievement, or a promising breakthrough.) as an only awarded chef.
- Three pairs of cutlery on the Michelin guide for Kämp Signe 2012
- Design Award 2015 - Ruokateko 2015 by Muoto 2015
- Wild Food Ambassador 2012–2016 by the Elo Foundation, the foundation for the promotion of Finnish food culture

== Bibliography ==
- Makuparit (ISBN 9789522208156, 2016) (Finnish)
- Vilda Örter Kokboken (ISBN 9789163610332, 2014) (Swedish)
- Wild, Weird and Wonderful (ISBN 9789525969436, 2013) (Finnish, English and Russian)
- Hedelmäistä, with Janne Tarmio (ISBN 9789526778433, 2013) (Finnish)
- Wild Herb Cookbook (ISBN 9789522204868, 2012) (English)
- Koivunmahlaa & kaviaaria, with Christer Lindgren (ISBN 9789522205322, 2012) (Finnish)
- Mäti - Helmiä lautasella, with Janne Tarmio (ISBN 9789526778419, 2012) (Finnish)
- дикие и увлекательно (ISBN 978-952-5969-52-8) (Russian)
- Villiä Vegeä (ISBN 978-952-220-9795) (Finnish)
- Villi City Vegaani (ISBN 978-952-264-748-1) (Finnish)
- Villisienikeittokirja (ISBN 978-952-321-461-3) (Finnish)
- Villisienet tunnistusopas (ISBN 978-952-321-946-5) (Finnish)
- Villiyrtit - Tunnistusopas (ISBN 978-952-321-096-7) (Finnish)
- Villiyrttikeittokirja (ISBN 978-952-373-951-2, 2025) 13. edition, out in May 2025 (Finnish)
