= Samuel Thayer (author) =

American author and forager

Samuel J. Thayer (born 1976) is an American wild food forager and author. Thayer is a self-taught natural historian. In 2001, Thayer founded Forager's Harvest and acts as editor and director of the institute.

== Early life and education ==
Born in Wausau, Wisconsin, to Richard and Ellen Thayer, he was raised in Madison and graduated from Madison East High School in 1994. He has one brother and two sisters.

== Books ==
Thayer has published four books as of 2026: The Forager's Harvest: A Guide to Identifying, Harvesting, and Preparing Edible Wild Plants; Nature's Garden: A Guide to Identifying, Harvesting, and Preparing Edible Wild Plants; Incredible Wild Edibles: 36 Plants That Can Change Your Life and Sam Thayer's Field Guide to Edible Wild Plants of Eastern & Central North America. The Forager's Harvest self-published all of them.

== Awards ==
He has won three awards for his book Nature's Garden: A Guide to Identifying, Harvesting, and Preparing Edible Wild Plants First Place for the 2006 Midwest Book Awards in the category "Nature"; First Place for the 2010 Midwest Book Awards, Midwest Independent Publisher's Association, and second place in the category "Gardening/Agriculture" for The 2011 Benjamin Franklin Award.
