= List of stoves =

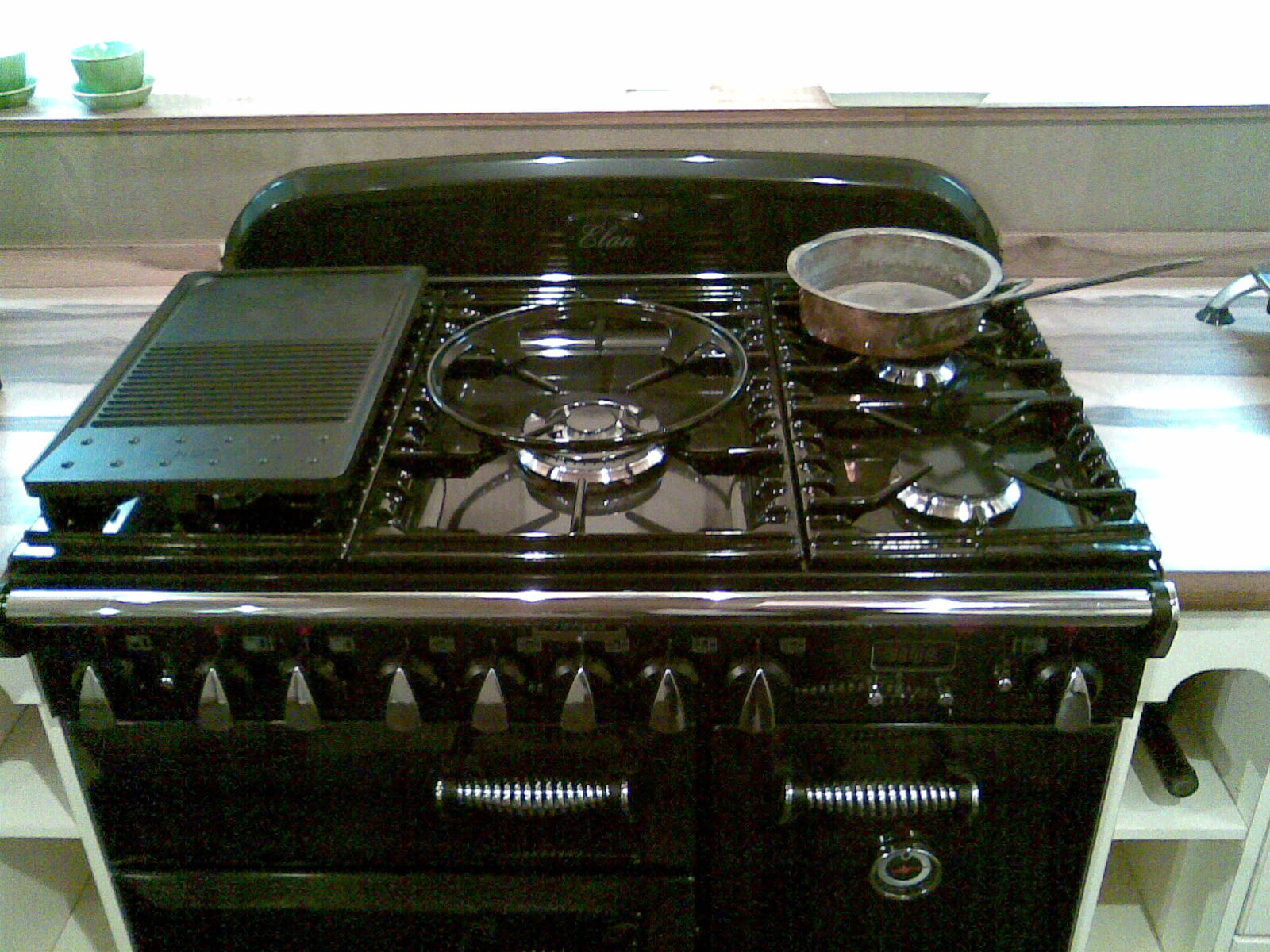
A kitchen stove with oven that operates using flammable gas

This is a list of stoves. A stove is an enclosed space in which fuel is burned to provide heating, either to heat the space in which the stove is situated, or to heat the stove itself and items placed on it. Stoves are generally used for cooking and heating purposes.

== Stoves ==
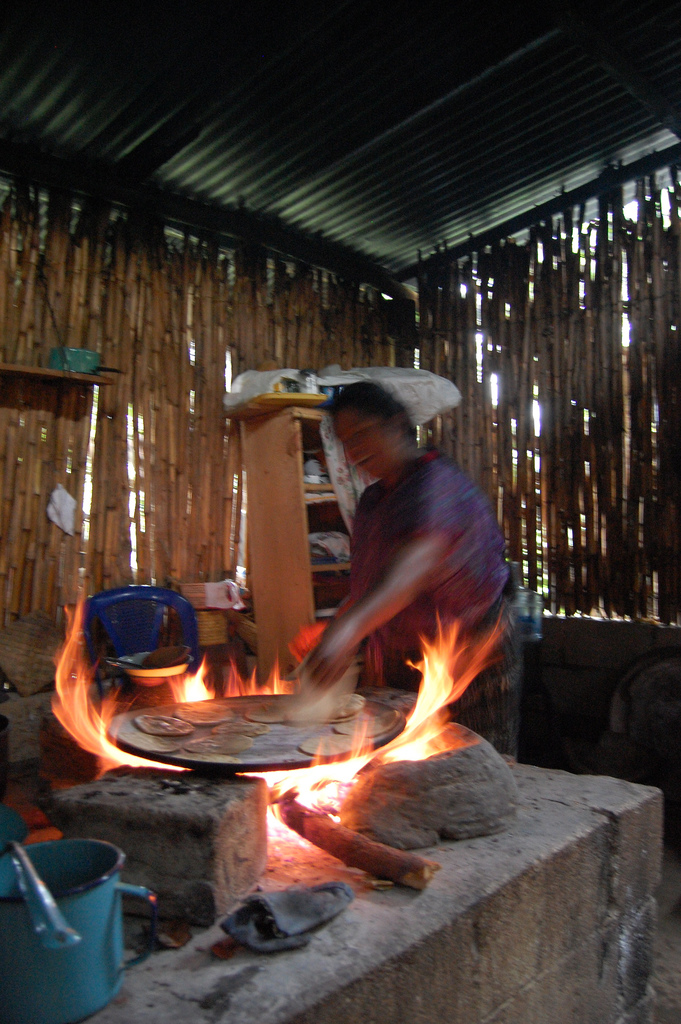
Cooking tortillas (flatbread) on a wood-fired 3-stone cook stove

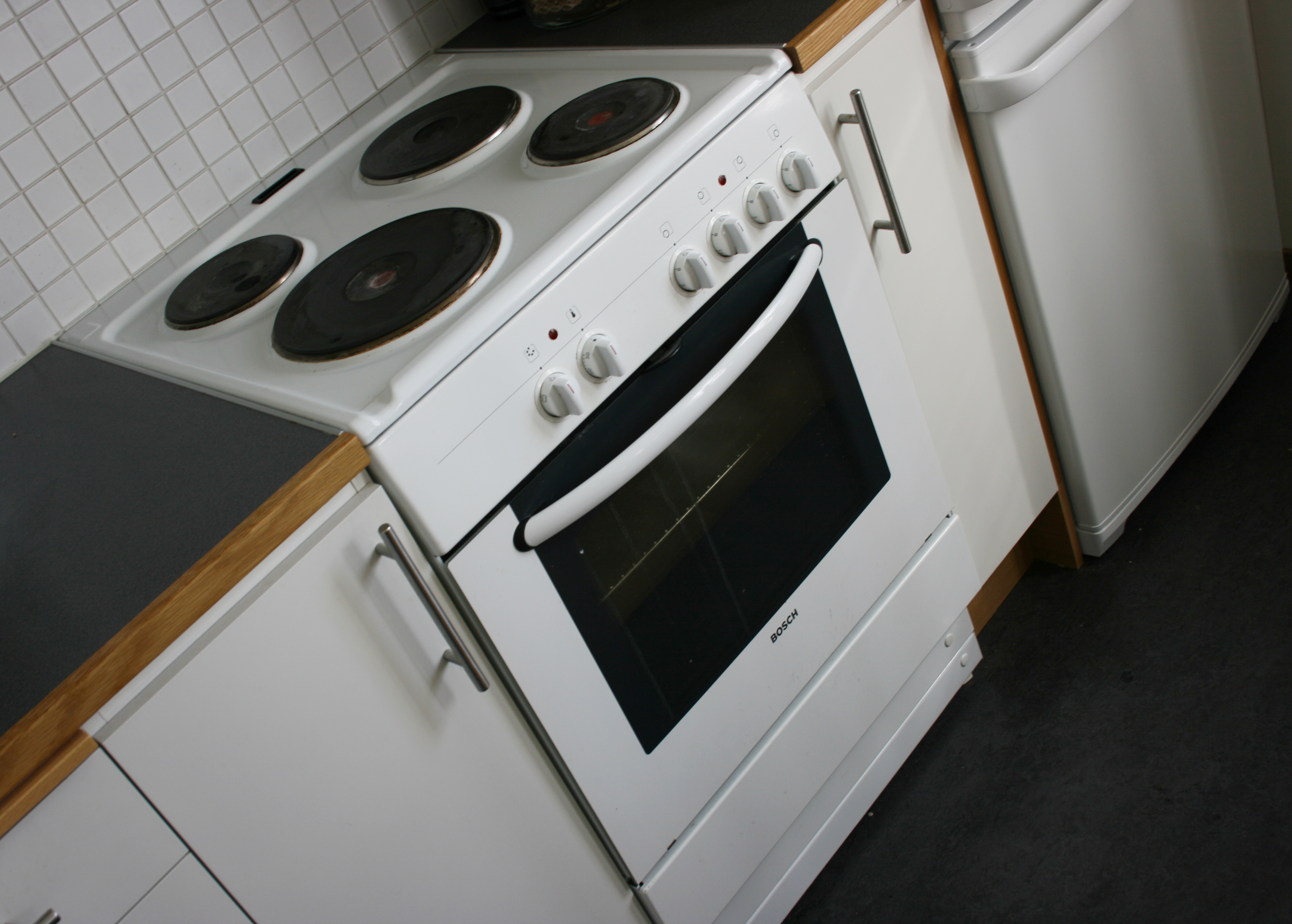
An electric stove

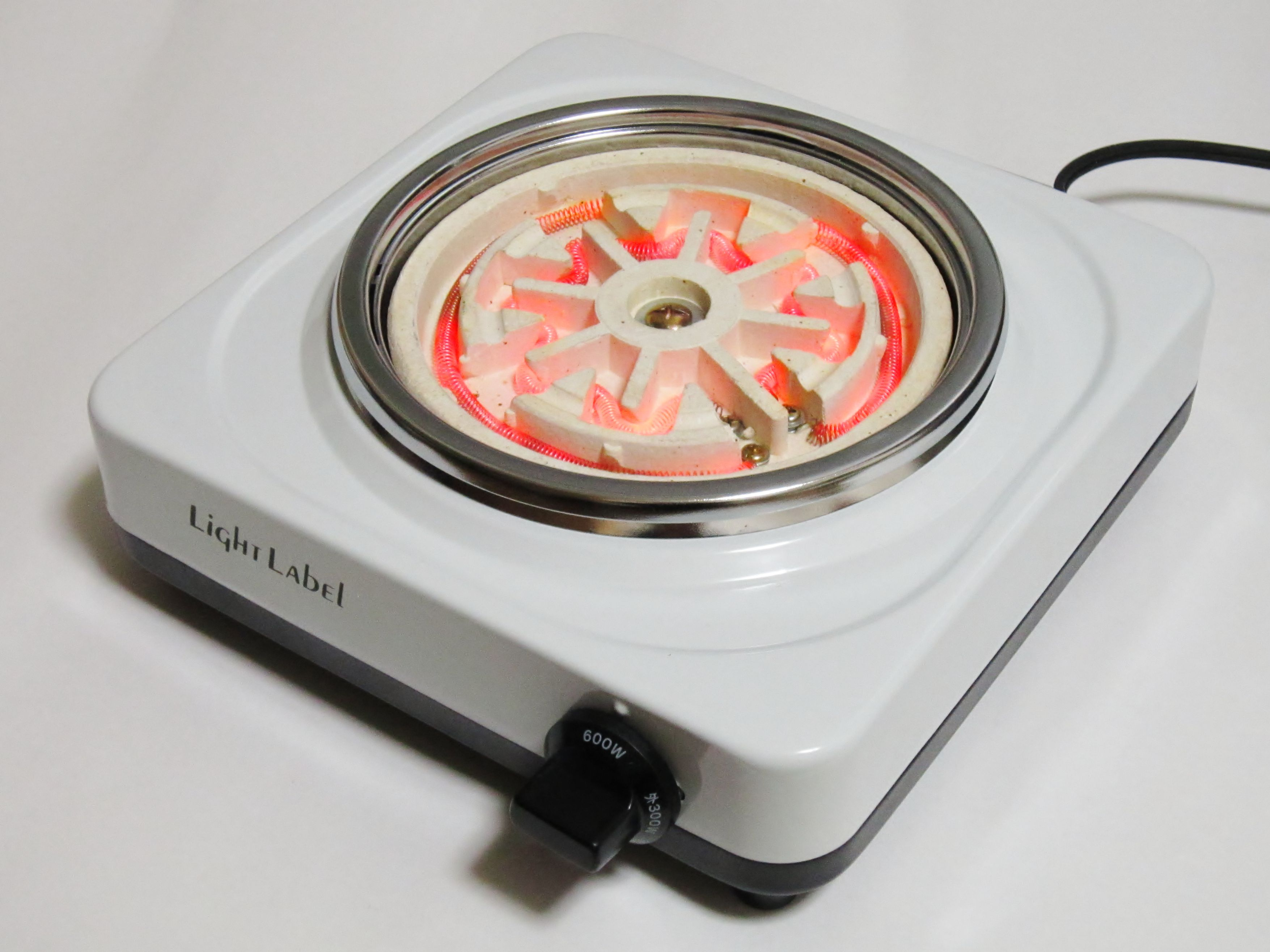
A hotplate-style electric tabletop burner

- Aprovecho – Aprovecho Research Center has worked on designs for cook stoves, primarily for use in developing countries. They are best known for the Rocket stove, developed by their technical director Dr. Larry Winiarski.
- Bachelor griller – a countertop kitchen appliance with which a single person can grill, bake, boil or roast small portions of food
- Bamboo stove – an historical stove made in China in the late 14th century, it included bamboo to form the frame of the stove. The sides were cemented with clay and the inside walls and the ring on top were iron. It was about a foot tall.
- Beverage-can stove – a homemade, ultralight portable stove. The simple design is usually made entirely from aluminium cans and burns alcohol.
- BioLite
- Burjiko – a stove from Somalia
- Chambers stove – a generic name for several different kitchen cooking appliances sold under the Chambers brand name from 1912 to approximately 1988. Their ranges and stand-alone ovens were known for their patented insulation methods, which enabled them to cook on retained heat with the fuel turned off.
- Clean-burning stove – a stove with reduced toxic emissions. The term commonly refers to wood-burning stoves for domestic heating, although it is also applied to cooking stoves.
- Cocklestove or ceramic stove or tile stove
- Community Cooker
- Cook stove – heated by burning wood, charcoal, animal dung or crop residue. Cook stoves are commonly used for cooking and heating food in developing countries.
- EcoZoom
- Electric stove
- Foot stove
- Franklin stove – wood-burning stove designed by Benjamin Franklin, and improved and made practical by David Rittenhouse
- Gas stove – uses syngas, natural gas, propane, butane, liquefied petroleum gas or other flammable gas as a fuel source.
- Hibachi
- Hoàng Cầm stove – a stove intake and chimney system which diffused and dissipated smoke from cooking which prevented aerial detection of smoke by American military planes.
- Hobo stove – a style of improvised heat-producing and cooking device used in survival situations, by backpackers, hobos, tramps and homeless people.
- Hot plate
- Jetboil
- Kenya Ceramic Jiko – a charcoal stove.
- Kitchen stove – also referred to as a range, a kitchen appliance designed for the purpose of cooking food. Kitchen stoves rely on the application of direct heat for the cooking process and may also contain an oven, used for baking.
- Lò trấu – a type of versatile fuel burning cook stove used in Vietnam since the 1950s
- Masonry heater or masonry stove
- Multi-fuel stove
- Portable stove
- Potbelly stove
- Primus stove
- Range
- Red Cross stove – a kitchen or parlor stove used for cooking and heating mainly North American homes of the late 19th and early 20th-century.
- Rocket stove
  - Rocket mass heater
- Rotimatic
- Shichirin – a lightweight, compact, and easy-to-move cooking stove
- Sigri (stove)
- Solar cooker
- Soyer stove - a portable stove, designed to provide several cooking methods in the field for military deployed forces.
- Tea stove
- Tommy cooker – a compact, portable, solidified alcohol fuelled stove issued to British troops (Tommies) in World War I. It was notoriously ineffective; one soldier complained that it took two hours to boil half a pint of water.
- Turkey fryer
- Wood-burning stove – a heating appliance capable of burning wood fuel and wood-derived biomass fuel, such as wood pellets. Generally the appliance consists of a solid metal (usually cast iron or steel) closed fire chamber, a fire brick base and an adjustable air control.
Stoves

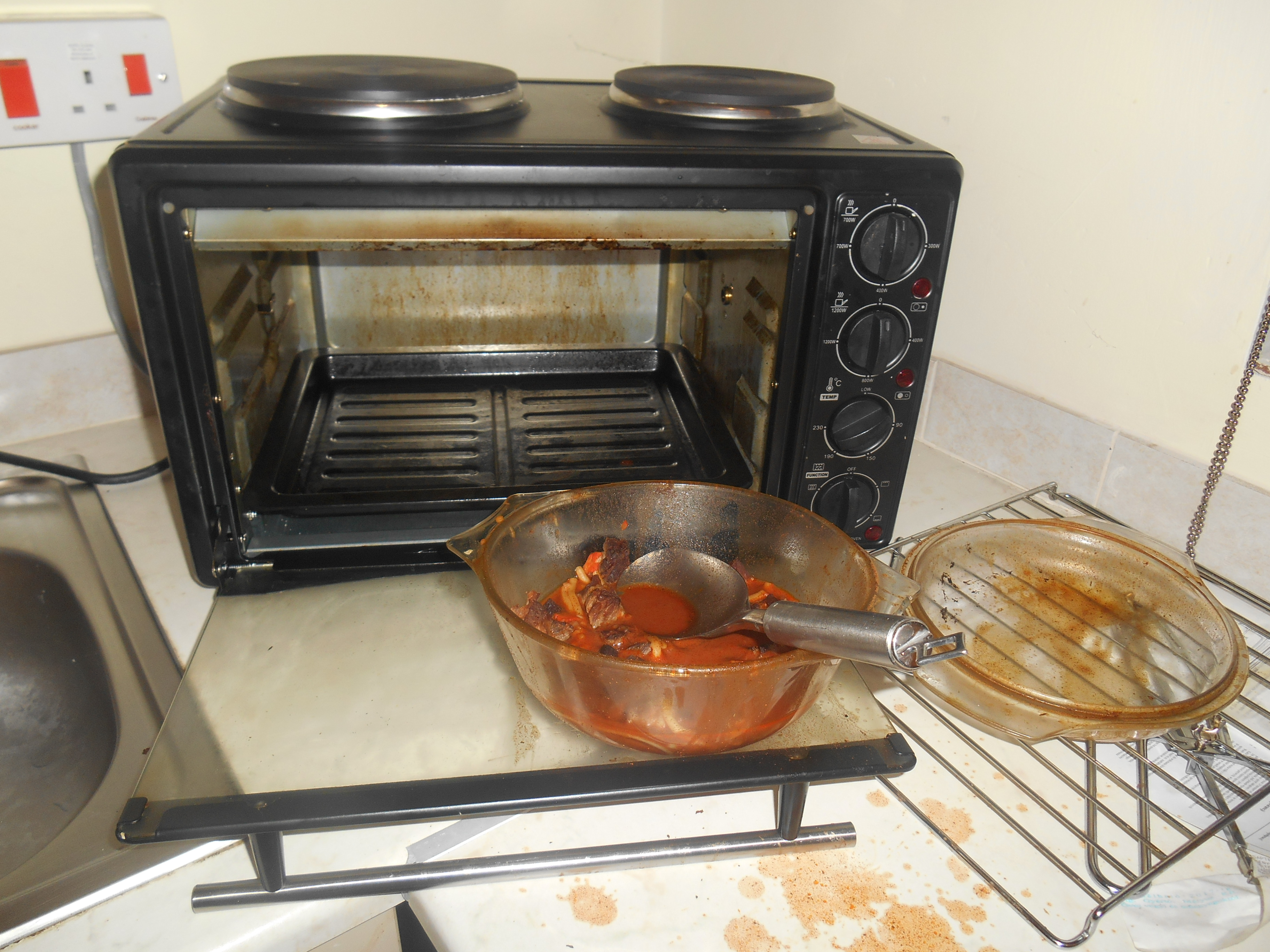
A bachelor griller, with cooking stains

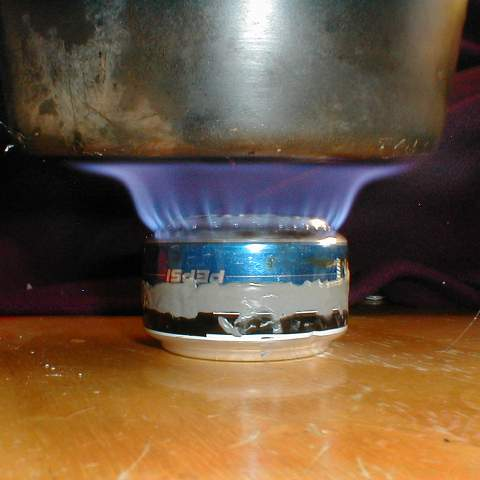
A beverage-can stove; the pot stand is omitted for clarity

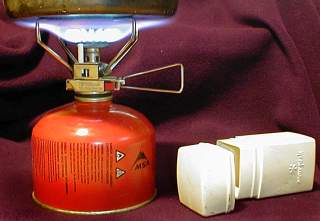
A small portable stove running on MSR gas and the stove's carrying case

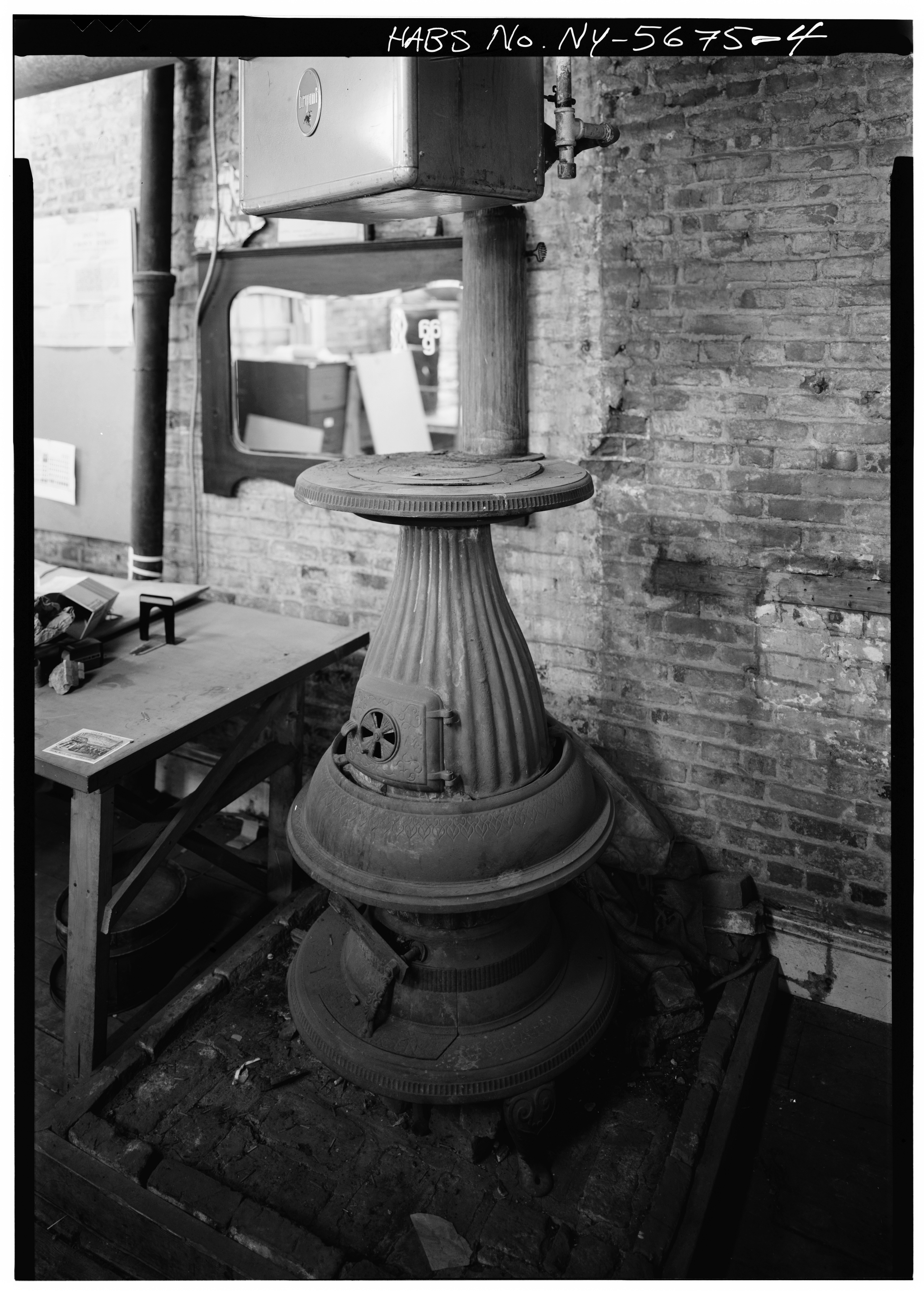
A potbelly stove at a museum in New York

A brazier style of tea stove

== See also ==
- Campingaz
- Cooker
- Grilling
- Barbecue
- Flattop grill
- Gas appliance
- Griddle
- History of the portable gas stove
- Kelly Kettle
- List of cooking appliances
- List of cooking techniques
- List of home appliances
- List of ovens
- Outdoor cooking
