= EcoZoom =

- EcoZoom’s logo
- Type: Private
- Founded: 2011
- Founder: Ben West
- Website: ecozoom.com

EcoZoom is a certified B Corporation that makes charcoal, wood and biomass cook stoves. The company has offices in Portland, Oregon and Nairobi, Kenya. EcoZoom holds the exclusive license to distribute stove technology designed by Aprovecho in developing countries and a second license to distribute in the United States.

== History ==
EcoZoom was started in April 2011 by Ben West to increase the distribution of improved cookstoves in developing nations.

In January 2011 EcoZoom received B Corporation status

In January 2012, EcoZoom joined the Portland State University Social Innovation Incubator Vector Program. That February, EcoZoom completed a 10,000-stove pilot program with the Mexican government to replace open-fire cooking and indoor cooking stoves with a double-burner stove called La Mera Mera. That November, EcoZoom is named by Sustainable Business Oregon as a Sustainable Business Award Finalist

In May 2013, EcoZoom opened up a second office in Nairobi, Kenya. That September, EcoZoom Case Study was used by the Global Alliance for Clean Cookstoves to demonstrate the product design process to increase adoption of stoves.

== Product design ==
EcoZoom stoves use a rocket stove design for efficient combustion of fuel. As a result, less fuel is used compared to an open fire with less smoke emitted, helping cooks from inhaling harmful smoke while using less natural resources.

EcoZoom sells stoves direct-to-consumer in the US while completing multiple international projects in Haiti, Kenya, Mexico, Rwanda, Somalia, and South Africa.

== See also ==
- Cook Stove
- List of stoves
- Portable stoves
- Rocket stove
- Wood-burning stoves
- Aprovecho
