= InStove =

InStove (Institutional Stove Solutions) is a 501(c)(3) nonprofit organization established in 2012.

== History ==
Engineer Damon Ogle and carpenter Fred Colgan, working with Aprovecho Research Center, developed a highly efficient solid-fuel cookstove for use in institutional settings in 2008. Ogle and Colgan's prototype for InStove's 60 liter capacity cookstove was a rocket stove, powered by internal combustion and 87% more efficient than traditional three stone fires.

In July 2012, Colgan founded Institutional Stove Solutions (InStove) as a 501(c)(3) nonprofit organization. InStove developed the 60 Liter Stove, and in 2013 the 100 Liter Stove, to address climate change, emissions, and deforestation issues. InStove is a partner of the Global Alliance for Clean Cookstoves. As of July, 2015, InStove's institutional cookstoves have the highest published test scores in the world against the International Standards Organization's International Workshop Agreement on clean cookstoves.

== 60 and 100 liter stoves ==
The "rocket stove" design concentrates heat and mixes combustion gasses to create operating temperatures in excess of 1100 degrees Celsius, which allows the stoves to literally "burn up the smoke." This produces a fire that is cleaner and more efficient than is possible otherwise. The sunk-in pot with heat-retaining skirt design allows food to cook more quickly, reducing cooking time by 20-50%.

Each stove placed can offset the carbon footprint of 2.7 American households each year and can save up to 88 tons of firewood annually.

The 60 Liter InStove uses 2 kilograms of fuel every two hours at peak temperature and boils 30 liters of water in 30 minutes; the 100 Liter InStove boils 50 liters of water in 30 minutes.

== Stove placements ==
As of June 2014, InStove has distributed over 1,000 stoves in 27 countries around the world. These include Sudan, Ethiopia, South Sudan and Kenya in conjunction with the United Nations, as well as Nigeria., Senegal, and 10 other sub-Saharan countries. A 60 Liter stove was also placed as a part of Opportunity Village, a transitional housing community in Eugene, Oregon as an effort to feed residents and reduce expensive propane costs.

In 2014, InStove opened "InStove Manufacturing Limited" as a benefit corporation to sell stoves to domestic clients such as El Sancho, a Mexican Restaurant in Bend, Oregon which uses a 100-liter stove to sustainably cook large amounts of food.

== Allied technologies ==
InStove has paired their 60 Liter InStove with a medical grade autoclave manufactured by the Wisconsin Aluminum Foundry (WAFCO). The unit is designed to serve as either a backup for urban health centers or as a primary system for rural clinics without access to electricity, providing sanitation of medical instruments as well as waste to reduce vectors of disease.
