= Billycan =

Metal bucket used for boiling water over a campfire

A billycan is an Australian term for a lightweight cooking pot in the form of a metal bucket commonly used for boiling water, making tea/coffee or cooking over a campfire or to carry water. It is commonly known simply as a billy, or occasionally as a billy can (billy tin or billy pot in Canada).

== Usage ==
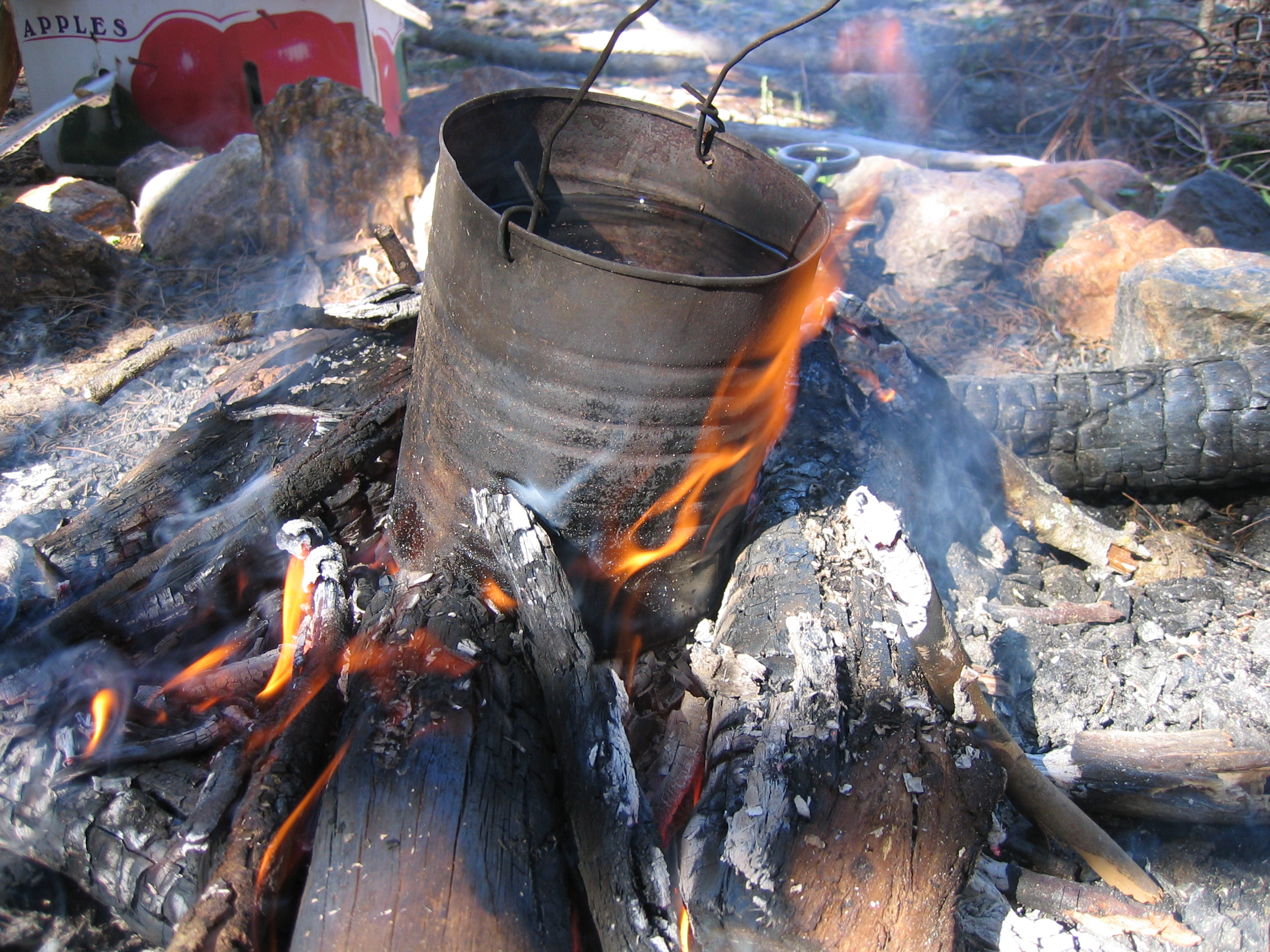
A traditional billycan on a campfire

The term billy or billycan is particularly associated with Australian usage, but is also used in New Zealand, and to a lesser extent Britain and Ireland.

In Australia, the billy has come to symbolise the spirit of exploration of the outback and is a widespread symbol of bush life, although now regarded mostly as a symbol of an age that has long passed.

To boil the billy most often means to make tea. This expression dates from the Australian gold rushes and probably earlier. "Billy Tea" was the name of a popular brand of tea long sold by Australian grocers and supermarkets. Billies feature in many of Henry Lawson's stories and poems. Banjo Paterson's most famous of many references to the billy is surely in the first verse and chorus of Waltzing Matilda: "Waltzing Matilda and leading a waterbag", which was later changed by the Billy Tea Company to "And he sang as he watched and waited 'til his billy boiled ...".

The billycan has seen increased international adoption amongst outdoors and Bushcraft enthusiasts in the early 21st century, a result of increased exposure through online communities. Modern usage ranges from examples explicitly produced and marketed as billy cans, to user adaptations of other metalware into pots with bail handles, intended to be suspended over an open fire.

== Etymology ==
Although there is a suggestion that the word may be associated with the Aboriginal billa (meaning water; cf. Billabong), it is widely accepted that the term billycan is derived from bouilli can, the name given to the empty canisters used for preserving soup and bouilli and other foods. With the addition of a handle, the tins were re-purposed for boiling water. Letters to newspapers in the early 20th century support this view and David George Stead quoting his father, who emigrated in 1862 aged 16, wrote "the term "billy can" was commonly used in south coastal England, to describe a "bouilli" can or tin.

The preservation of foods in tin canisters began in 1812 at the firm of Donkin, Hall and Gamble in Bermondsey, England.

The reuse of the empty cans probably began at the same time but it is not until 1835 that there is a record of "an empty preserved-meat-canister serving the double purpose of tea-kettle and tea-pot".

By the 1840s, soup and bouilli tin or bouilli tin was increasingly being used as a generic term for any empty preserved food can.

The earliest known use of billy for kettle is in an 1848 Tasmanian newspaper report of a criminal trial. A defendant is reported as saying "he put some bread on the table and the "billy" on the fire." Reminiscences by Heberley and Davenport place billy or billies at earlier events but these accounts were written much later.

Another early example from 1849 shows that use of the term was possibly widespread in Australia. It occurs in idyllic description of a shepherd's life in South Australia: "near the wooden fire, is what is called the billy or tea-kettle".

From 1851 the gold rushes spur British emigration to Australia with many gold diggers writing letters home describing the journey to Australia and life on the goldfields and many writers mentioning their use of a "billy". From these it is known:

- In 1853 soup and bouilli cans were converted to useful items on an emigrant ship.
- "Billy - (this is what you call a tin-can, which is used very often at home for milking cows in, but which the diggers have christened Billy) - and a useful Billy he is: in it we make our tea and coffee".

By 1855 "tin billys" are no longer just repurposed bouilli tins but are being sold by a Melbourne importer and by 1859 are being manufactured in Australia with "Billys, all sizes" being sold at the Kyneton Tin and Zinc Works.

== Whitely Kings ==
Named for the secretary of the Pastoralists' Union of New South Wales, this was the swagman's contemptuous term for billycans improvised from a tin can and a length of wire as carried by inexperienced travellers. John Whiteley King (1857–1905) enticed hundreds of unemployed city men to the shearing sheds as a strike-busting strategy.

== See also ==
- Kelly kettle
- Mess kit
- Dixie, a large metal pot (12 gallon camp kettle) for cooking, brewing tea etc.; used in military camps
- Hexamine stove
- Outdoor cooking
- Tiffin carrier
- Trangia
- List of cooking vessels
- Tea in Australia
