= BioLite =

American start-up energy company

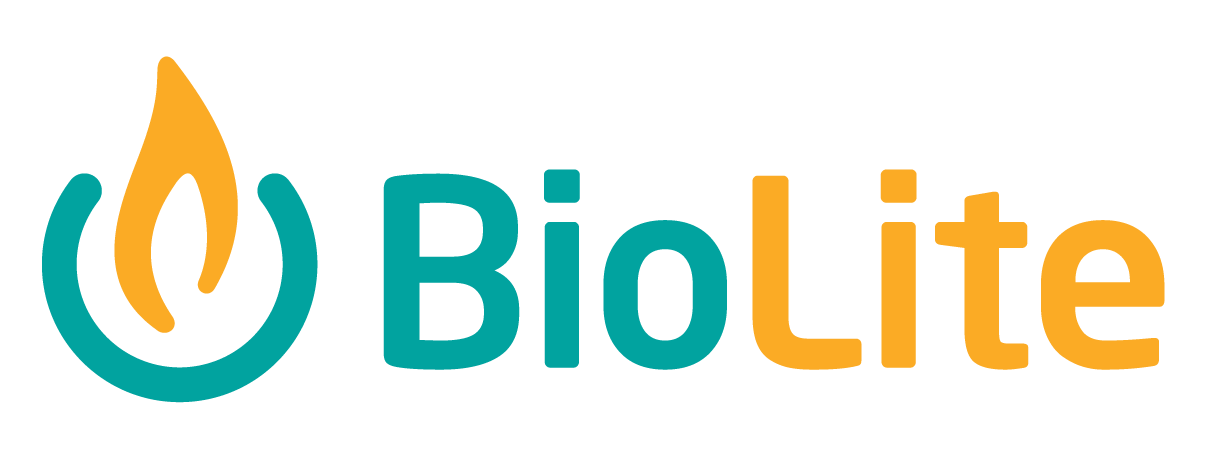
- BioLite's logo
- Headquarters: New York City
- Website: https://www.bioliteenergy.com/

BioLite is a New York City-based startup company that produces off-grid energy products for outdoor recreational use and emerging markets. The company is known for its wood-burning stoves that use thermoelectric technology to create usable electricity from the heat of their fires. It was founded in 2006.

== History ==
Jonathan Cedar and Alexander Drummond together developed the BioLite stove technology. They met while working at Smart Design, a design consultancy in New York City. The two inventors became interested in portable stoves that utilized small amounts of biomass to power battery-powered fans. The idea evolved to a low-emissions stove that used a thermoelectric generator called the BioLite CampStove, which was officially launched in 2012. BioLite is headquartered in DUMBO, Brooklyn with an additional office in Nairobi, Kenya.

In 2009, the founders learned that their technology could have impact on off-grid developing communities and bifurcated the business to incorporate both outdoor recreational and emerging markets. Using a modified rocket stove and working with the Aprovecho Research Center, Cedar developed a larger model cook stove named the HomeStove, designed to replace harmful indoor cooking fires.

=== Timeline ===
==== 2009 ====
- January – CampStove prototype wins top prize at ETHOS Combustion Conference
- September – Cedar leaves Smart Design to work on BioLite full-time
- November – HomeStove H1 prototype is created

==== 2010 ====
- March – The addition of a USB Port is considered for the future of BioLite
- April – With the help of the Aprovecho Research Center, thermoelectric rocket stove emissions were measured

==== 2011 ====
- February – BioLite settles down in Brooklyn, NY and hires its first staff members
- May – In an effort to understand user needs, BioLite field tests the H2 HomeStove prototype in India
- September – After five rounds of prototypes, the CampStove design is approved
- November - Winner of the St Andrews Prize for the Environment
- November – Field tests are run in Ghana and Uganda with the H3 prototype

==== 2012 ====
- May – The first CampStove orders ship
- April – USPTO grants BioLite patents for core technology
- November – HomeStove H4 prototype approved for pilot testing

==== 2013 ====
- February – BioLite launches Portable Grill Accessory
- Spring – BioLite debuts at REI stores nationwide
- September – BioLite launches KettlePot Accessory

==== 2014 ====
- June – BioLite launches BaseCamp Stove campaign and raises $1MM on Kickstarter
- August – BioLite launches KettleCharge
- October — BioLite wins Fast Company Innovation by Design Award for the BioLite Home Stove

==== 2015 ====
- February – BioLite launches the NanoGrid, expanding the organization's energy offering into the Lighting category
- November – BioLite announces that it has erased its carbon history and commits to ongoing carbon neutrality

==== 2016 ====
- February – BioLite launches Energy Ecosystem: PowerLight Mini, SolarPanel 5 Series, and CookStove
- September - BioLite launches the BaseLantern on Kickstarter.

2017

- February - BioLite expands product offering with a second generation of the CampStove, CampStove 2 featuring more power and an onboard battery. The company also launches a 10-watt solar panel and three sizes of battery banks they call Charge 10, Charge 20, Charge 40.
- September - BioLite launches a smokeless wood-burning fire pit on Kickstarter.
- November - BioLite launches SolarHome 620, a solar-powered lighting, charging and radio system for off-grid homes around the world. This product is sold throughout the outdoor recreation community and to families living off the grid in Kenya.

2018

- February - BioLite launches a small solar-powered lantern called SunLight.
- September - BioLite releases new HeadLamp on Kickstarter: HeadLamp 330

2019

- BioLite launches a rechargeable, 330-lumen headlamp

2020

- BioLite expands HeadLamp offering to include a 200-lumen and 750-lumen headlamp model
- BioLite releases all-new cooking accessory line for FirePit

2021

- BioLite releases a color-changing lantern utilizing ChromaReal Technology: AlpenGlow Lantern Series

== BioLite products ==
=== HomeStove ===
The HomeStove's design converts the heat of fire into usable electricity to power a fan, which then reduces fuel needs by 50%, toxic smoke by about 95%, and carbon monoxide emissions by 91%. Additionally, the amount of CO_{2} saved per year by one stove equals the amount that's saved by buying a hybrid car. The remaining off-grid energy that does not power the fan can then be used to charge portable devices through a USB port, such as cell phones and LED lights. Moreover, the effects of deforestation are lessened and time is regained by women and children who spend hours gathering wood for open fires. Manufacturing costs are low, and this efficient wood-burning stove pays for itself within six to seven months.

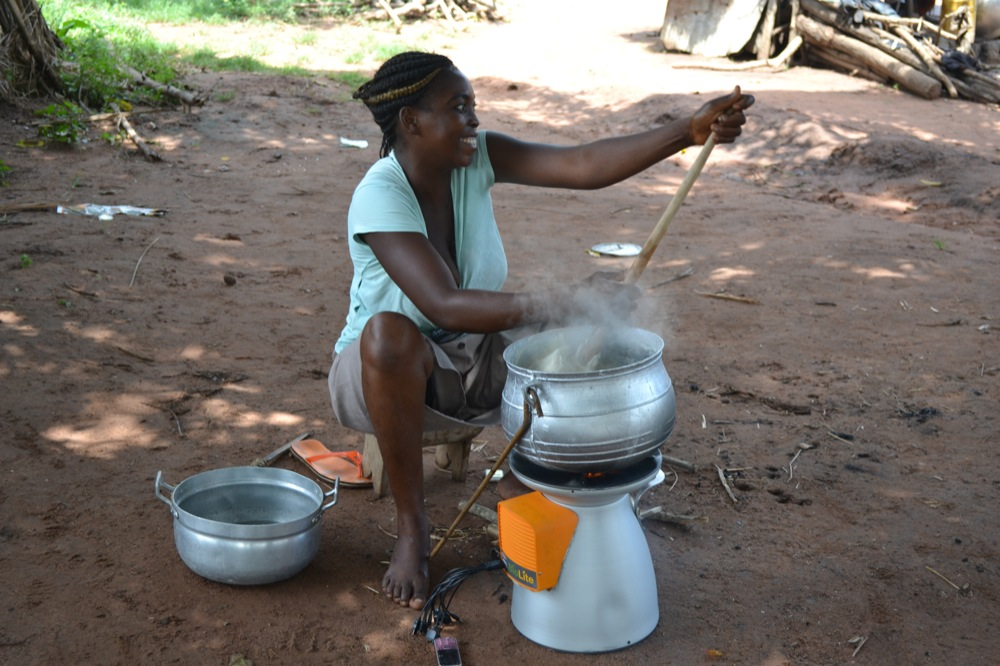
The BioLite HomeStove in use

BioLite focuses on sustainable market development by using a market-based approach, as opposed to donations or a “one for one” model. This allows for local entrepreneurship and stimulates local markets. The HomeStove is currently in large-scale pilot testing across India, Ghana, and Uganda. Recently, thanks to a Spark Fund grant, BioLite will be kicking off a project in Uganda with partners at Impact Carbon. The Spark Fund grant is part of the Global Alliance for Clean Cookstoves, an organization that provides clean cook stoves to people in areas with high poverty rates. Its mission is to reduce the number of deaths caused by open cooking fires each year (approximately four million) and is endorsed by people such as Julia Roberts and Hillary Clinton (who referred to BioLite in her announcement of the UN Clean Cookstove Alliance).

=== CampStove ===
The CampStove was launched in 2012 and is predominantly used by outdoor enthusiasts. Renewable biomass fuels – such as sticks, pinecones, and brush – power the stove instead of resources like charcoal or petroleum. The CampStove can boil water in 4.5 minutes. Smaller than the HomeStove, the CampStove is 8.25” tall and weighs 33 oz, but like the larger model, excess heat is converted into energy. BioLite sells stoves in over seventy countries. The CampStove has also been used as an emergency preparedness tool. In the aftermath of Hurricane Sandy, tables were set up in New York City, offering those without power hot drinks and a chance to charge their cell phones.

=== Portable stoves and grills ===
The BioLite Portable Grill, released in 2013, is designed to work with the CampStove. Features include a fuel intake lid for fire maintenance, compact design with foldable legs and a travel cover for transportation. Other accessories for the CampStove include a FlexLight for nighttime cooking, a KettlePot for boiling water, and a CoffeePress for camp coffee.

In 2017, BioLite launched a smokeless wood-burning fire pit called the FirePit on Kickstarter.

=== Lighting products ===
BioLite also has a set of rechargeable lights: HeadLamp 330, HeadLamp 200, HeadLamp 750, SiteLight String, AlpenGlow 250 and AlpenGlow 500. BioLite lanterns incorporate rechargeable lithium-ion batteries with LED ChromaReal Technology, can be recharged with a USB connection, and can supply power to external devices via USB.

BioLite's SolarHome 620 has a solar panel that charges up a central control box which powers 3 hanging lights, USB charge-out, and an MP3/FM radio system. The SolarHome 620 is currently in use in over 40,000 homes across western Kenya as well as vans, cabins, and sheds throughout the United States and beyond.

=== Charging products ===
BioLite also sells products that can generate and store electricity for USB devices. They make the SolarPanel 5+, the SolarPanel 10+, and the Charge 20, Charge 40, and Charge 80. The SolarPanels are both solar panels with a "kickstand", with the "+" model including an internal lithium-ion battery for energy storage. The Charge products are re-chargeable battery banks to store power for USB devices.

== Business model ==
According to BioLite, they used their “near-term CampStove market as a way to generate revenue that essentially allowed [them] to become [their] own investors in the HomeStove vision.” That involves a market-based approach to some of the issues in emerging communities. The recreational and emergency preparedness markets of the CampStove and other products keep the HomeStove and SolarHome 620 low-cost for off-grid communities in sub-Saharan Africa. BioLite uses local distribution networks and alters their stove design to support the variety of cultural cooking preferences.

== See also ==
- Cook stoves
- List of stoves
- Portable stoves
- Rocket stove
- Wood-burning stoves
