= Sanga Moses =

Ugandan social entrepreneur

- Born: Uganda
- Occupation: Social entrepreneur
- Employer: Eco-fuel Africa Ltd
- Title: Founder and Chief Executive Officer

Sanga Moses is a Ugandan social entrepreneur and founder and chief executive officer of Eco-fuel Africa Ltd. (EFA). Moses is notable for being one of the National Geographic's Emerging Explorers and then as winner of the $1 million Verizon's Powerful Answers Award for innovative technological solutions to global challenges.

== Education and early life ==
Sanga Moses grew up in a small village in western Uganda. He was the first in his clan to graduate from University, and in 2005 he was awarded a Bachelor of Business Administration from the Makerere University in Kampala.

== Career ==
Moses started his professional career as a trained accountant in Uganda's capital, Kampala, and worked in that role for three years from 2006 to 2009. He left that career in 2009, after visiting his family in the countryside in Western Uganda and meeting his 12-year-old sister: she had to travel 10 km on foot to purchase firewood for the family instead of attending school. At that point, Moses decided to invest all his life savings ($500) in the creation of an affordable alternative to wood-based fuel.

In 2010 he launched EFA and produced the first kilns and briquette machines. EFA is a social enterprise selling clean-fuel to approximately twenty thousand families in Uganda and employing 120 people. The EFA business model created revenue for hundreds of local women retailers, who sell clean cooking charcoal (biochar) briquettes, and for thousands of farmers suppliers, who produce biochar from agricultural waste employing EFA's kilns technology. Moses worked with engineers to develop kilns and briquetting machines to produce affordable biochar. He aims to make this technology available to other sub-Saharan rural populations with a similar lack of affordable, clean bio-fuel. Moses has established that EFA's environmental policy include the reinvestment of part of its profits in Uganda reforestation.

In 2014, he was nominated for The Future Awards Africa and worked with the Global Social Benefit Institute of Santa Clara University to develop EFA.

== Awards ==
- 2011 Unreasonable Institute Fellow.
- 2012 TED Fellow.
- 2012 Community Solutions Fellow.
- 2014 National Geographic's Emerging Explorers.
- 2017 Verizon's Powerful Answers Award.
