= Lisa Kleissner =

American businesswoman

Lisa Kleissner (born 1954) is an impact investor and co-founder of KL Felicitas Foundation, Toniic, and Hawaii Investment Ready.

== Early life ==
She was raised in Hawaii where she graduated from Kamehameha Schools in 1972 and then University of Hawaii. She was an early employee at Apple.

She met her husband, Charly Kleissner, when she was in high school.

== Professional life ==
In 2010, she and her husband founded Toniic, a group for impact investors.

The Kleissners were early investors in Biolite, which produces clean energy stoves, and MA'O Organic Farms.

In March 2013, she launched Hawaii Investment Ready, an organization that fosters socially-minded businesses.
