= Biolite (disambiguation) =

BioLite is a Brooklyn-based start up that produces energy focused camp stoves.

Bioliths, or biolites, are sedimentary rocks formed by living organisms or their remains.
