= Hexamine stove =

Type of cooking stove

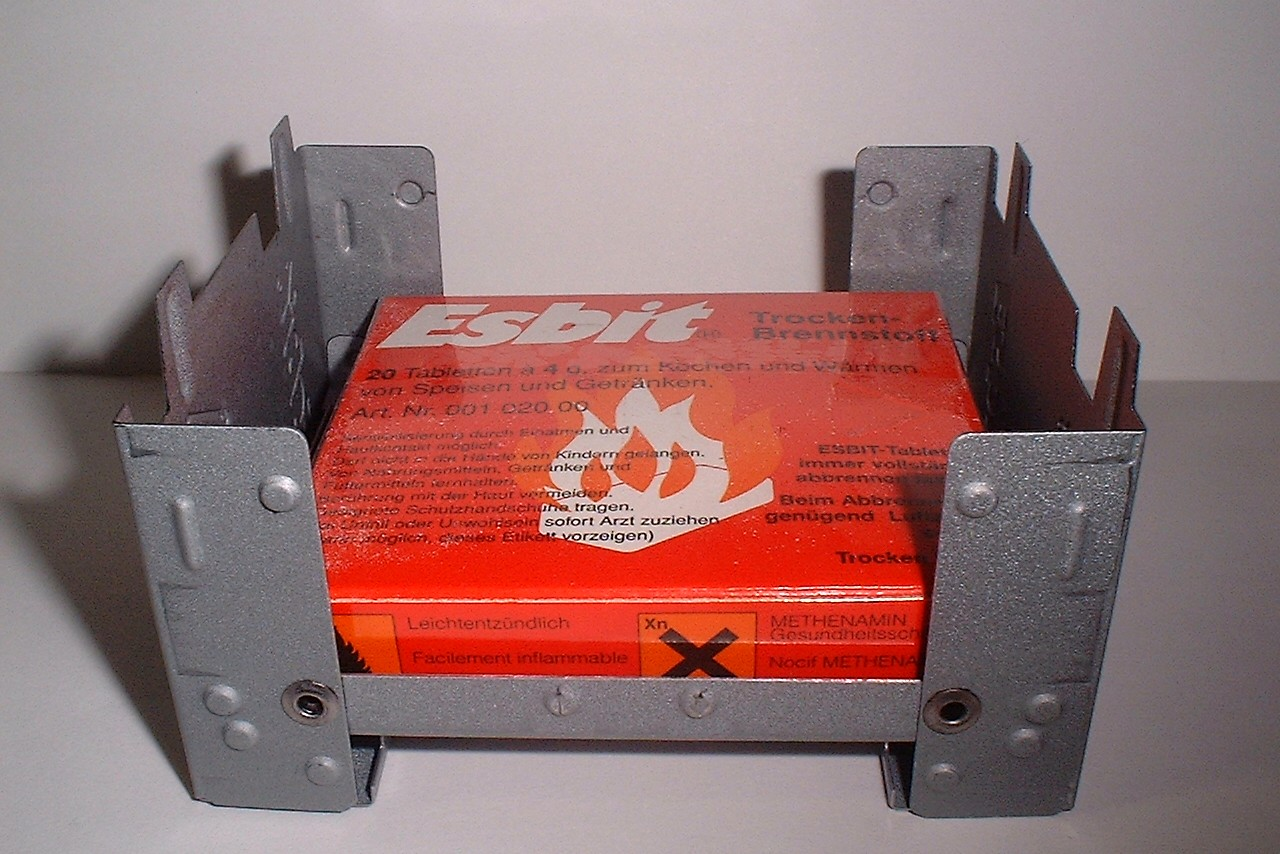
Folding hexamine stove with packaged fuel

A hexamine stove, or hexi-stove, is a cooking stove that uses hexamine fuel tablets. These tablets, known chemically as hexamethylenetetramine or methenamine, are often referred to colloquially as "hexi tabs" or simply "tabs." Hexi-stoves are favored for emergency situations and are commonly issued to military service members in the field due to their portability and reliability.

The stove serves a dual purpose: it acts as a platform for cooking and, when flipped upside down, as a windbreak to shelter the flame during cooking. Designed for convenience, the hexamine stove folds into a compact size for easy storage and transport. It can be used with its folding legs either up or down, depending on the specific cooking needs.

A notable feature of the hexi-stove is its ability to protect the fuel tablets during transport. When the stove is folded, it securely encloses the hexamine tablets, shielding them from damage. Hexamine is an efficient and stable fuel, making it ideal for portable stoves due to its high energy density and ease of ignition.

== See also ==
- Beverage-can stove
- Outdoor cooking
- Rocket stove
- List of stoves
