= Hoang Cam =

Hoàng Cầm may refer to:

- Hoàng Cầm (poet) (1922–2010), a Vietnamese poet
- Hoàng Cầm (general) (born 1920), of the Vietnam People's Army
- Hoàng Cầm stove, a type of kitchen stove that was widely used by the Vietnam People's Army and named after a cook who invented the device
