= Kenya Ceramic Jiko =

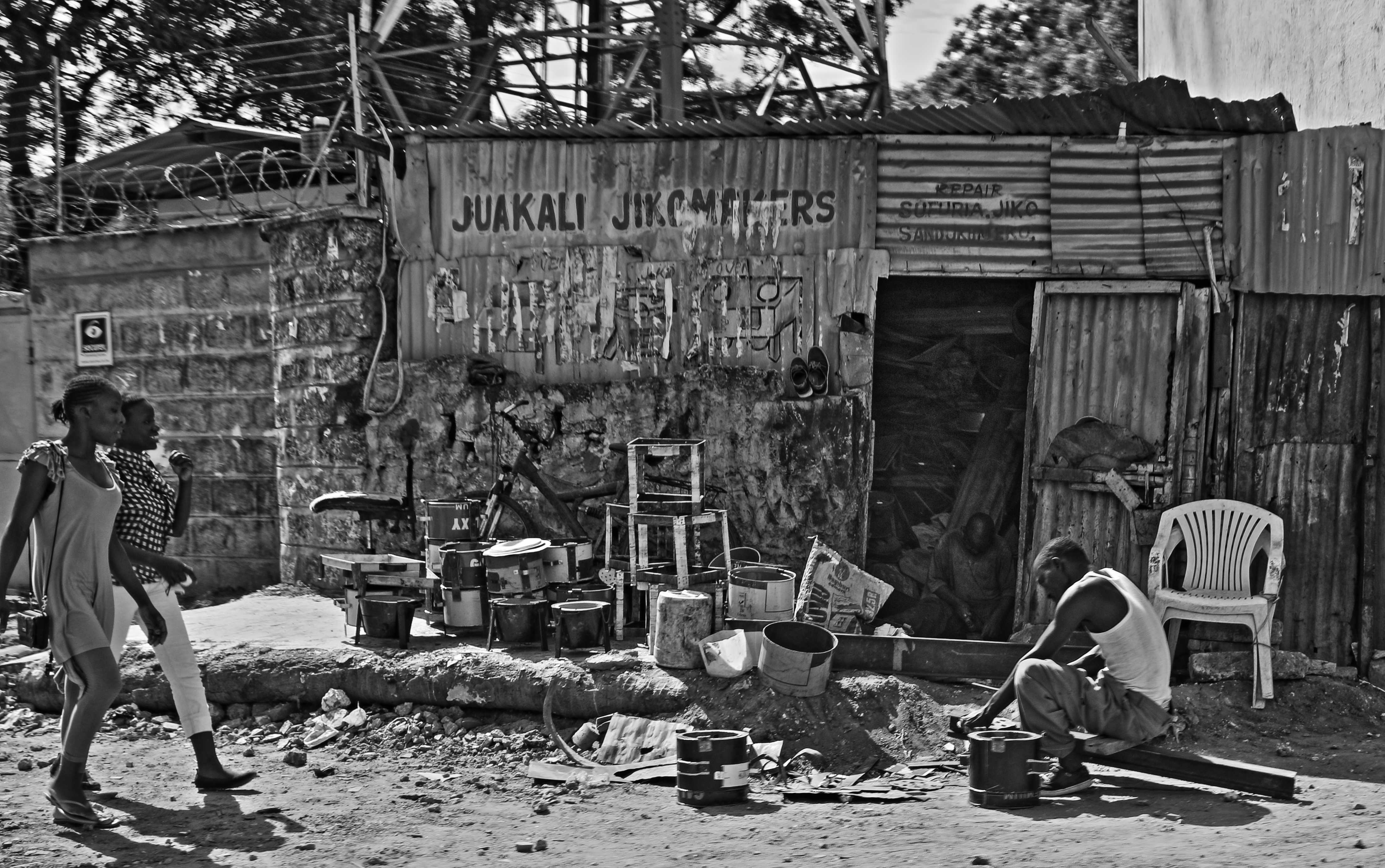
Making Jiko charcoal stoves in Mombasa

The Kenya Ceramic Jiko is a portable, charcoal-burning stove used for cooking, found primarily in urban homes in Kenya. It was developed through the collaboration of both local and international groups, to reduce fuel consumption.

== Description ==
The Kenya Ceramic Jiko, known as KCJ, is a stove which uses charcoal as fuel. It has as an hourglass shape, and it is made from a metal exterior, with a ceramic internal liner. The ceramic liner has holes in its base, which allows ash to fall through and be collected in the box located at the bottom of the stove. The depth of the most universally used types of the KCJ range from 70 to 100 mm.

== History ==
The idea for the Kenya Ceramic Jiko came from the Thai Bucket Stove and was modeled after the Kenyan Traditional Metal Stove known as TMS. It was from the re-designing of these two stoves that the Kenya Ceramic Jiko was created. Through the collaboration of both local and international organizations, the Kenya Ceramic Jiko evolved and took shape. Organizations such as CARE, UNICEF, The Bellerive Foundation, as well as the United States and German aid agencies all played a role in the development and promotion of the KCJ. The Kenya Energy and Environment Organization (KENGO) has played an active role in increasing awareness, and promoting the use of the Kenya Ceramic Jiko since 1982.

== Engineering ==
To produce the Kenya Ceramic Jiko, two main materials are needed: clay to make the ceramic, and metal. The moulding of the stove is made from mild sheet metal, which can be attained from scrap metal such as that found in bitumen drums. For the sheet metal, the minimum required thickness is 0.5 mm, and the maximum is 0.8 mm. All joints in the metal frame are held together using either riveting or folding. For the pot-rest, a steel round bar between 7–8 mm in thickness should be used, while an 0.8 mm thick sheet metal should be used to create the pot-feet. The metal used to create the base of the stove can be even thinner, about 0.25 mm thick, as the ceramic inner lining protects it from direct contact with heat.

The ceramic part of the stove is made with clay, which is shaped and then fired. The qualities for the ideal type of clay for use are: ability to maintain good strength when fired at 900 °C; ability to remain slightly porous when temperatures reach 1150 °C; the clay should not warp or change shape when fired at 1250 °C. When the clay is fired up, it should turn to a light pink to white colour, and, to reduce the likelihood of cracking, it should shrink less than 8% after being fired. Clay which meets all the above standards is generally referred to as a "fireclay".

To produce the Kenya Ceramic Jiko, two types of skilled labour are needed, a metalworker, and a clay worker. Other than a hammer, all other tools needed to manufacture the Kenya Ceramic Jiko can be found from scraps or hand made.

== Health ==
Open indoor combustion of wood, coal, charcoal, peat (virtually any plant matter) can lead to health problems. At the temperature of a normal fire, these materials "burn dirty," wasting much of their potential fuel in the form of smoke. This incomplete combustion means that toxic gases (i.e., smoke, containing chemicals such as carbon monoxide, nitrous oxide, sulfur oxides) and particulate matter are blown up into the room's atmosphere. These gases and particles are clearly linked to increased risk of cancer and serious acute or chronic respiratory problems. The simplest way for people relying on open fires to reduce this risk may be to thoroughly dry (or dehydrate) fuel before burning it. The less water in the fuel, the hotter the fire, the cleaner the combustion, the cleaner the indoor air quality. Drying tinder is especially helpful, since wet tinder – with no help from the heat of an established fire – produces particularly harmful smoke.

== Environment ==
In Kenya about 70% of energy consumed is from wood fuel, with 80% of the population dependent upon it. Rural stove users typically burn wood directly, while the urban population tends to burn charcoal as fuel. The Kenyan Ministry of Energy and Regional Development estimated that, in 1986, the annual demand for wood as a fuel was 18.7 million tonnes, and growing at a rate of 3.6% per year. Cutting down trees for fuel has led to environmental degradation, including loss of forests, loss of biodiversity, destruction of habitats, and an increase in soil erosion. Reserves of wood were being exhausted by 40% more than the rate of replacement.

== Benefits ==
When used properly, the Kenya Ceramic Jiko has the ability to reduce fuel consumption by 20–50%, therefore reducing the demand for wood as a fuel resource. The stove may reduce 20% of emissions produced from incomplete combustion; however studies are still being conducted to confirm this. In addition, the Ceramic Jiko increases child safety as the ceramic liner prevents the stove from becoming extremely hot.

== See also ==
- List of stoves
