= Hoàng Cầm stove =

Stove that dissipated smoke through bamboo vents

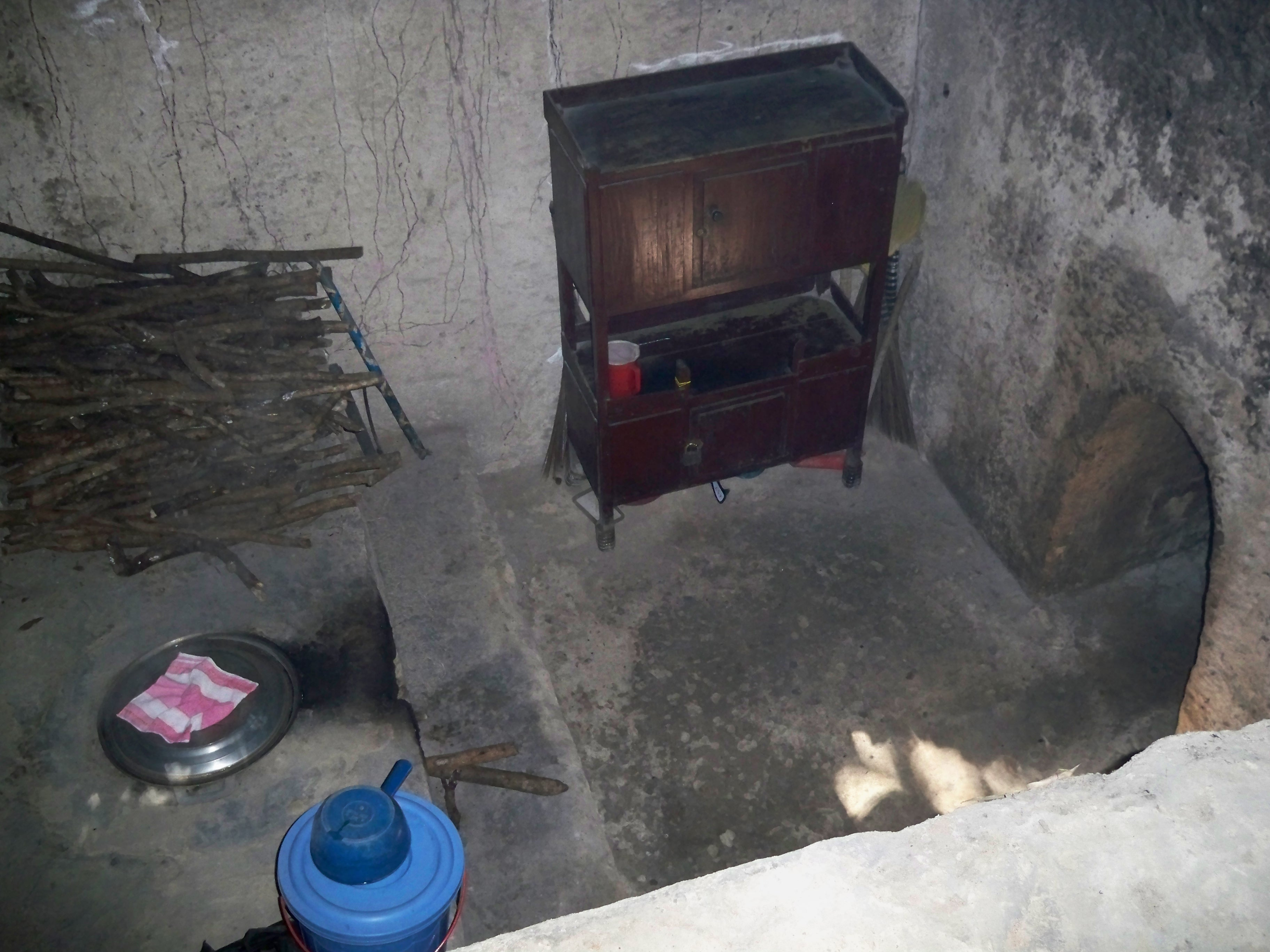
Hoang Cam stove

The Hoàng Cầm stove, named after its inventor, Hoàng Cầm, the chef, a Viet Minh soldier in 1951, was a stove intake and chimney system which diffused and dissipated smoke from cooking which prevented aerial detection of smoke by American military planes. They were used extensively in the Cu Chi tunnels and other hideouts. Another name for the cooker was the "guitar stove". The system required a deep, covered hole in the ground from which long underground bamboo vents dissipated the smoke.

The inventor of the stove was reportedly born 1916 and died 1996. He served in the PAVN since 1947 in the rear services, left the army in 1958 with the rank Captain. He was no known relation to either Hoàng Cầm, the general (born 1920) or Hoàng Cầm, the poet (born 1922), both of which are chosen names.

== See also ==
- lò trấu a traditional "rice husk stove" effective in rural energy saving
- List of stoves
