= Tea stove =

Brazier style of tea stove

A tea stove is a specialized type of Chinese brazier or stove designed to boil water.

== Styles ==
The basic brazier (Chinese: 風爐) has been made of different materials and shapes throughout Chinese history. Lu Yu had a special brazier designed just for heating water for tea, which is described in The Classic of Tea. The Pictorial of Tea Ware (Chinese: 茶具图赞), compiled by The Old Man Shenan (Chinese: 审安老人) c. 1269, is the earliest picture book on tea ware, and it depicts several types of tea stoves.

The bamboo stove also became very popular. One example of a type of bamboo stove is kujiejun (Chinese: 苦節(节)君). These were popular during the Song dynasty and Tang dynasty and could include a bamboo windscreen which would fit on top of the brazier.
