= Community Cooker =

The Community Cooker (Kiswahili translation "Jiko ya Jamii") is a type of stove invented by Nairobi-based architect Jim Archer, designed to produce safe, clean, and cheap energy for cooking from rubbish. It was designed to address the accumulation of rubbish throughout the Kenyan slum of Kibera, therefore aiding in addressing deforestation and groundwater pollution.

== See also ==
- List of stoves
