= Lò trấu =

Fuel burning cook stove

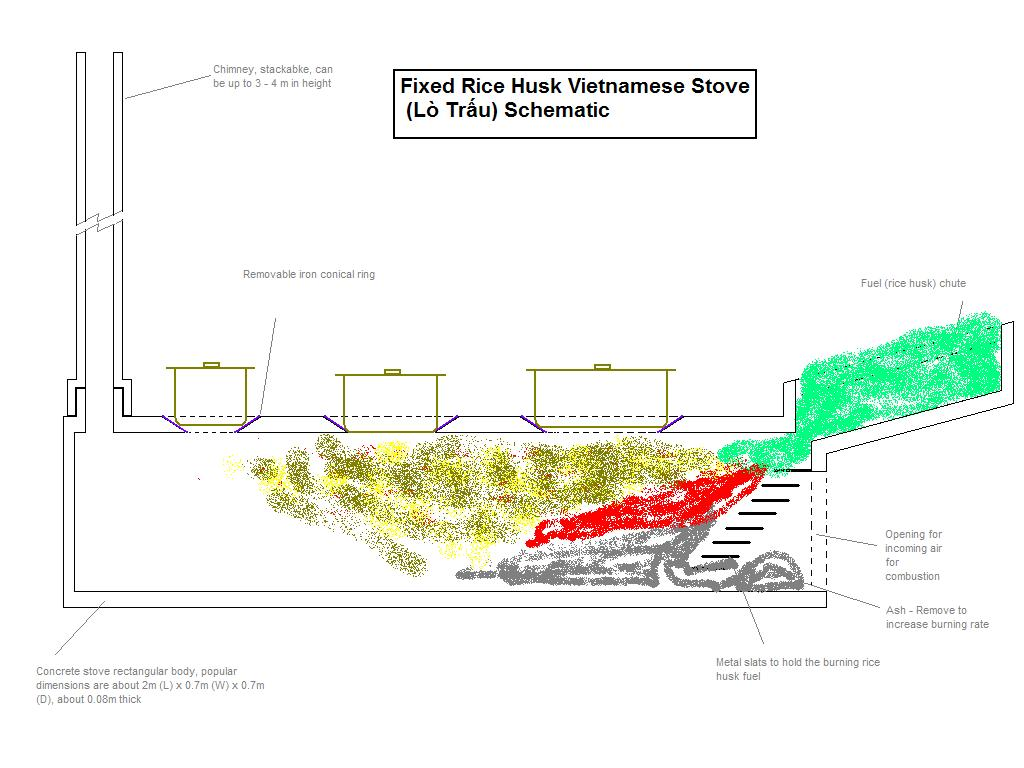
A lò trấu rice-husk stove

The lò trấu ("rice husk stove") is a type of versatile fuel burning cook stove used in Vietnam since the 1950s. Lò trấu comes from lò (stove) and trấu (rice husk). A kitchen with this kind of stove is a bếp trấu, "husk kitchen."

== History and design ==
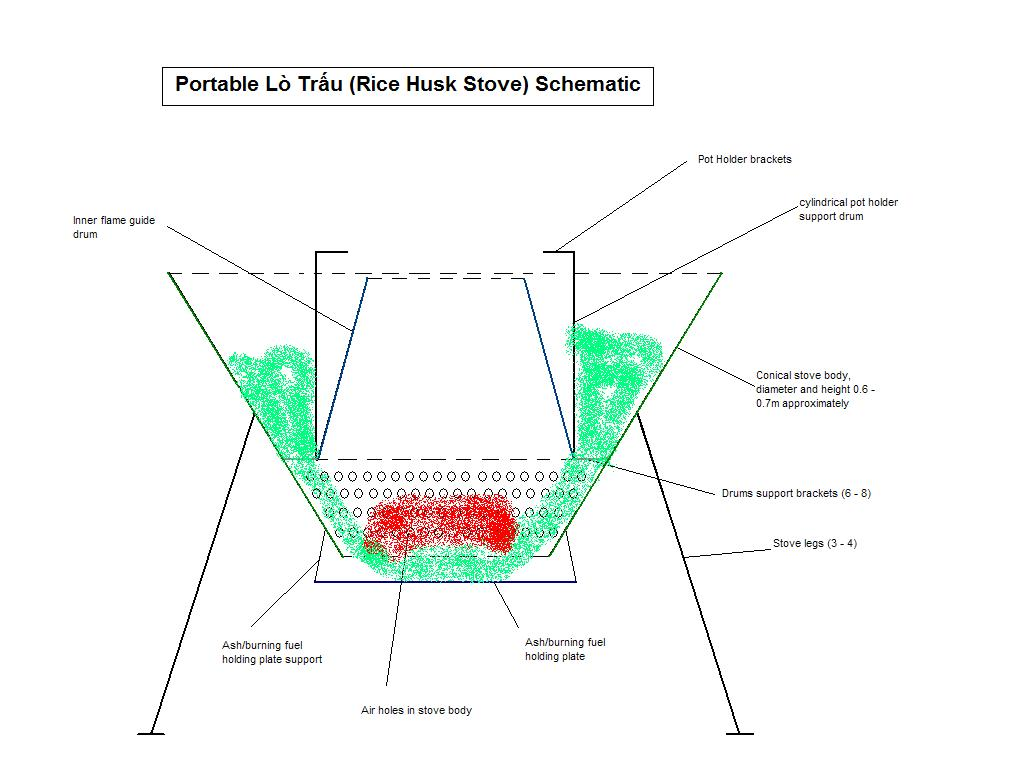
A portable lò trấu stove

The timeline of the development of the lò trấu is unclear, however, it is known that the Lo Trau has been in use in Vietnam at least since the 1950s. The fixed version Lo Trau stove is thought to be strongly related to the Castrol stove design of the architect François de Cuvilliés in 1735 and similar European designs in the 1830s, with flue pipes connected to the chimney, oven holes into which concentric iron rings on which the pots were placed. Depending on the size of the pot or the heat needed, one could remove the inner rings. A recent innovation is the portable Lo Trau. Its compact design and efficient operation has been the target of a number of studies. Recently it has been distributed in the Negros area of the Philippines in The Southern Negros Sustainable Agriculture Demonstration Projects in the 1990s. This relatively late uptake of apparently long-used innovation means the potential of rice husk as fuel has been overlooked by many for a long time, as well as the obscurity of the Lo Trau designs to the wider world.

== Operation ==
The stove is started by burning easily ignited material such as bundle of coconut leaves, newspaper partially embedded in the rice husks or other fuels in the combustion chamber area. After the fire is established, the updraft air from the stove designs will quickly sustain and magnify the combustion. The rate of combustion is regulated by removing an appropriate amount of ash from under the combustion area with a poker, thus enabling more fuel to enter.

== Fuel ==
Contrary to the name, the Lo Trau is quite versatile. It can burn wood chips, sawdust, small branches, small logs (with reduced heat controlling ability) and leaves.

== Efficiency ==
Open fire has four major disadvantages: It is dangerous, it produces much smoke, soot blackens the cookware, and the heat efficiency is poor. The enclosed design of the Lo Trau means complete combustion of the fuel, better use of the heat that it generated and thus reduce the fuel consumption by its furnace-like burning generated by the updraft through the chimney. Due to its furnace-like operation, most fuel will be burned thoroughly into fine ashes with almost no waste. In situ test findings showed that it took only 5 minutes to boil water using an approximate 180g of rice husk. This figure is impressive when compared to liquefied petroleum gas (LPG), fuelwood, and charcoal stoves, which required 5, 15, and 20 minutes respectively to boil the same amount of water. At the present time both wood and charcoal fires are frequently ignited using kerosene, a cost that would be eliminated with the rice husk stove.

== See also ==
- List of stoves
