= Hot plate =

Portable self-contained tabletop small appliance

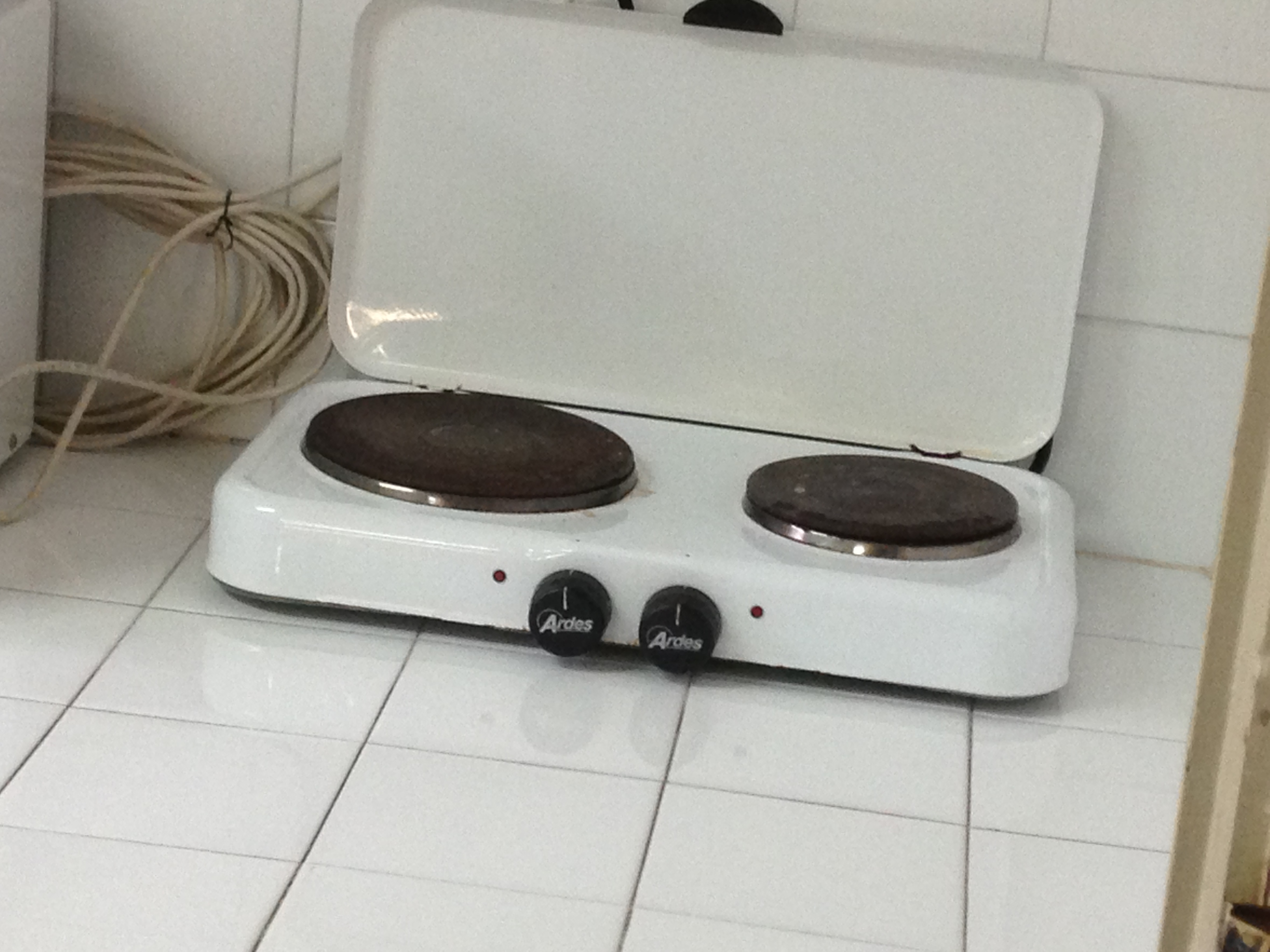
An electric tabletop hot plate

A hot plate or hotplate is a heated flat surface on a stove or electric cooker on which food may be cooked, either built into an electric cooker or kitchen stove, or portable, plugged into an electric outlet.

Hot plates can also be used as a heat source in laboratories.

== Description ==
A hot plate consists of a heated top which is flat and usually circular, and may be made of metal, ceramic, or heat-resistant glass, with resistive wire forming a heating element fitted underneath and a thermostat to control the temperature. An electric current is passed through the wire, heating it; the thermostat controls the temperature the top reaches.

A hotplate may be a portable self-contained tabletop small appliance cooktop, or incorporated into an electric cooker or kitchen stove. Portable hot plates are often used for food preparation, generally in locations where a full kitchen stove would not be convenient or practical.

== In laboratories ==
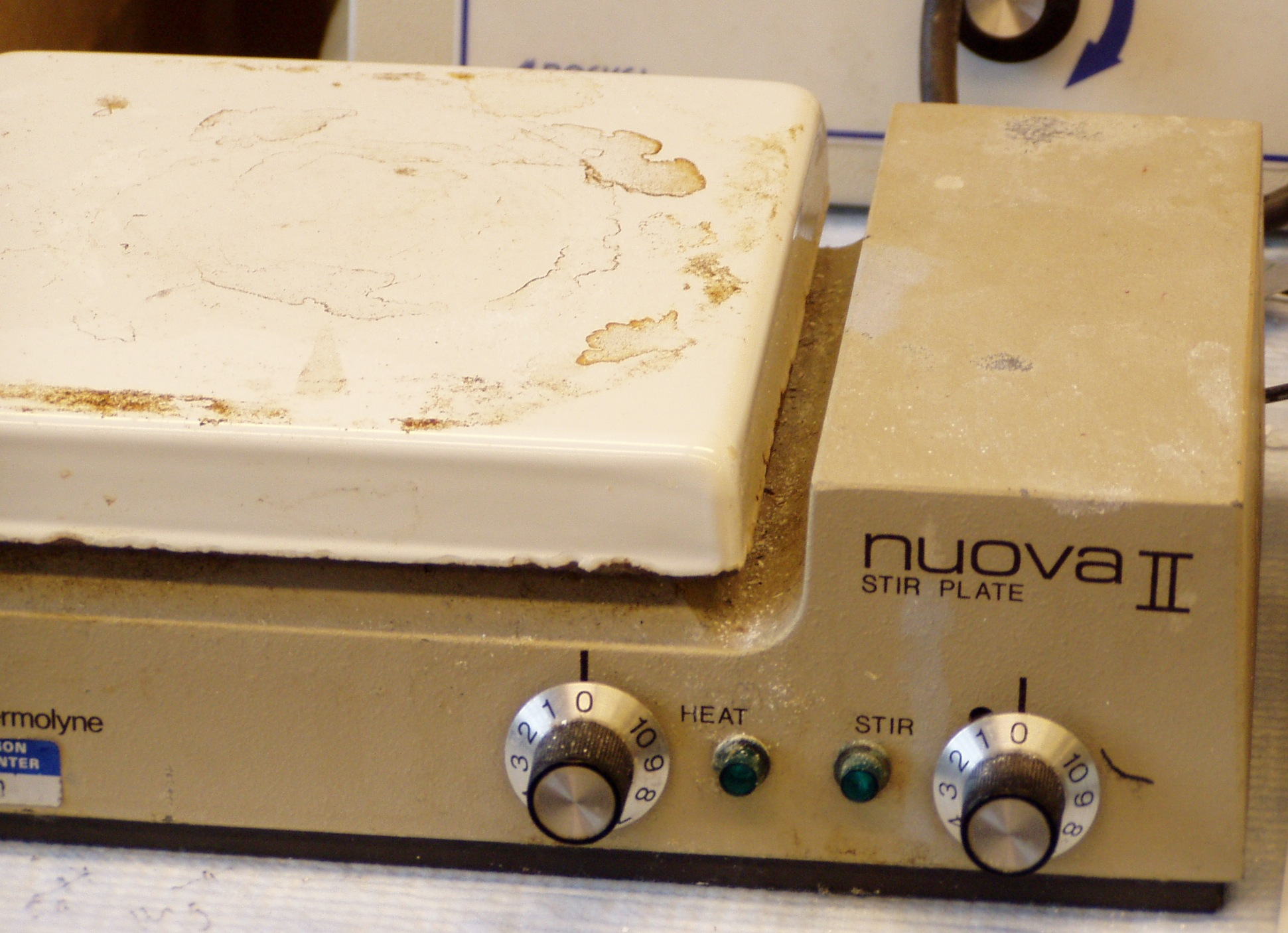
A laboratory hot plate with magnetic stirrer.

Hotplates are used in laboratories, outside the domestic environment, mainly for heating liquids. Some models also incorporate a magnet that can be used, in combination with a stirring bar placed in the vessel, to provide continuous agitation.

In laboratory settings, hot plates are generally used to heat glassware or its contents. Some hot plates provide an integrated magnetic stirrer, allowing a heated liquid to be stirred automatically. In a student laboratory, hot plates are used because baths can be hazards if they spill, overheat or ignite because they have high thermal inertia (meaning they take a long time to cool down) and mantles can be very expensive and are designed for specific flask volumes.

Two alternative methods for heating glassware using a hotplate are available. One method is to suspend glassware slightly above the surface of the plate with no direct contact. This not only reduces the temperature of the glass, but it also slows down the rate of heat exchange and encourages even heating. This works well for low boiling point operations or when a heat source's minimum temperature is high. Another method, called a teepee setup because it looks a little like a tipi, is to suspend glassware above a plate and surround the flask by a skirt of tinfoil. The skirt should start at the neck of the flask and drape down to the surface of the plate, not touching the sides of the flask, but covering the majority of the plates surface. This method is for glassware to be heated at higher temperatures because the flask is warmed indirectly by the hot air collecting under the skirt and unlike simply suspending the glassware, this method is better protected from drafts. Both these methods are useful in a student laboratory as they are cheaper, effective, safe, and the user does not have to wait for a bath to cool down after use.

== Industrial hot plates ==
Hot plates are widely used for many industrial applications. These hot plates vary in size, from 2 to over 300 square centimetres.

Typical operating temperatures vary from 100 to 750°C (212 to 1,382°F) and power requirements are usually in the 120 to 480 volt range. Most industrial hot plates will withstand a weight of more than 150 pounds (68 kilos).

Industrial hot plates which incorporate a porous heated plate are referred to as heated chucks. These plates, widely used in semiconductor manufacture, are used to heat thin sheets evenly by drawing the sheets firmly on the plate by suction.

Corrosion-resistant hotplates using special material and protective coatings are used in mining and related industries to heat samples of toxic chemicals.

Hot plates are widely used in the electronics industry as a method of soldering and desoldering components on circuit boards.

Hot plates with two heating surfaces are used to fuse plastic pipes, which may have a diameter exceeding 90 centimeters. The two pipes to be fused are pressed against the plate until the edges are soft. The plate is removed and the two pipes are pressed together and bonded. This process is called butt fusion.

== See also ==
- Bachelor griller
- Blech, a sheet of metal that may be placed over cooking burners to help in the observation of the Jewish Sabbath
- Cooktop
- Griddle, a flat heated cooking surface, maybe a pan, a gas powered version or in table-top electrical appliance form
- Heating element, a material that converts electrical energy to heat through resistance
- List of stoves
- Portable stove, a portable cooking device that may burn liquid or gas fuel
