= Burjiko =

Somali cooker or burning stove

A Burjiko (also Burjico, Burjik and Burjic) is a Somali-style cooker or charcoal burning stove. It is used to prepare a variety of foods.

== Production and distribution ==
The burjiko is made from sepiolite mined from Somalia's central district of El Buur.

The cooking instrument itself parallels in function those found in the Western world. Due to its portability, it is widely used in the Horn of Africa and Southwestern Asia; especially by nomads.

== Description and usage ==
The burjiko is circular in shape, with a deep hole running through its center where charcoal is placed. This hole is covered with different types of dishes, depending on what one wants to cook. For example, when making canjeero (Somali flatbread), one uses a flat surfaced dish. A deep dish, however, is preferable when cooking sauce.

Besides canjeero and sauce, burjikos are also often used to prepare pasta and meat dishes such as leg of lamb.

== See also ==
- Somali cuisine
