= Bamboo stove =

The original bamboo stove was made in China in the late 14th century. A monk named Xing Hai in the Ting Song temple on Mount Hui in Wuxi asked a travelling bamboo artisan to make him a stove on which he could boil water for tea. Surprisingly, it included bamboo to form the frame of the stove. The sides were cemented with clay and the inside walls and the ring on top were iron. It was about a foot tall, with a cylindrical top and square bottom, similar in shape to the Qian Kun (Heaven-Earth) mythological pot or a cong.

There are several paintings including a bamboo stove, amongst which are The Bamboo Stove by T'ang Yin (1470–1524) and the later Tasting Tea made from Spring Water by Chin T'ing-piao (latter half of the 18th century). Poems praising the stove were written and these were mounted on a scroll known as "The Bamboo Stove Painting Scroll".

A society called the Blue Mountain Poetry Society was founded in the late 15th century. They built a meeting hall and garden at the foot of Mt Hui and found the stove which had been lost and returned it to the temple. Early in the 17th century the stove was lost again and the temple also burned down. The scroll was found again during the reign of the Kangxi Emperor (1662–1722) and a poet from Wuxi called Gu Zhenguan had two copies of the stove made. He took these and the scrolls to Mount Hui where a new Ting Song temple was built.

The original stove was also found again at a farmer's house by a monk and returned to Wuxi. In 1751 the Qianlong Emperor visited the temple because of the fame of the bamboo stove. He wrote about it and the Second Spring Under Heaven (or Er'Quan (Second Spring) for short), whose water was famous for making wonderful tea. The emperor wrote four poems about the stove and visited it again six years later. This time he wrote two more poems and named its room "The Bamboo Stove Mountain Chamber". He then had a copy of the stove made and constructed a Bamboo Stove Mountain Chamber in the Western Hills.

The emperor made more visits to the temple in later years and wrote more poems about the stove. In the Taiping Rebellion of 1860 the temple was again destroyed and the rolls of poems which were found again in Shanghai given to the Mount Hui temple in Wuxi.

== Special names ==
- kujiejun is a special name for bamboo stove, popular during the Tang and Song dynasty.
- tea stove

== See also ==
- List of stoves
