= Bachelor griller =

Kitchen appliance

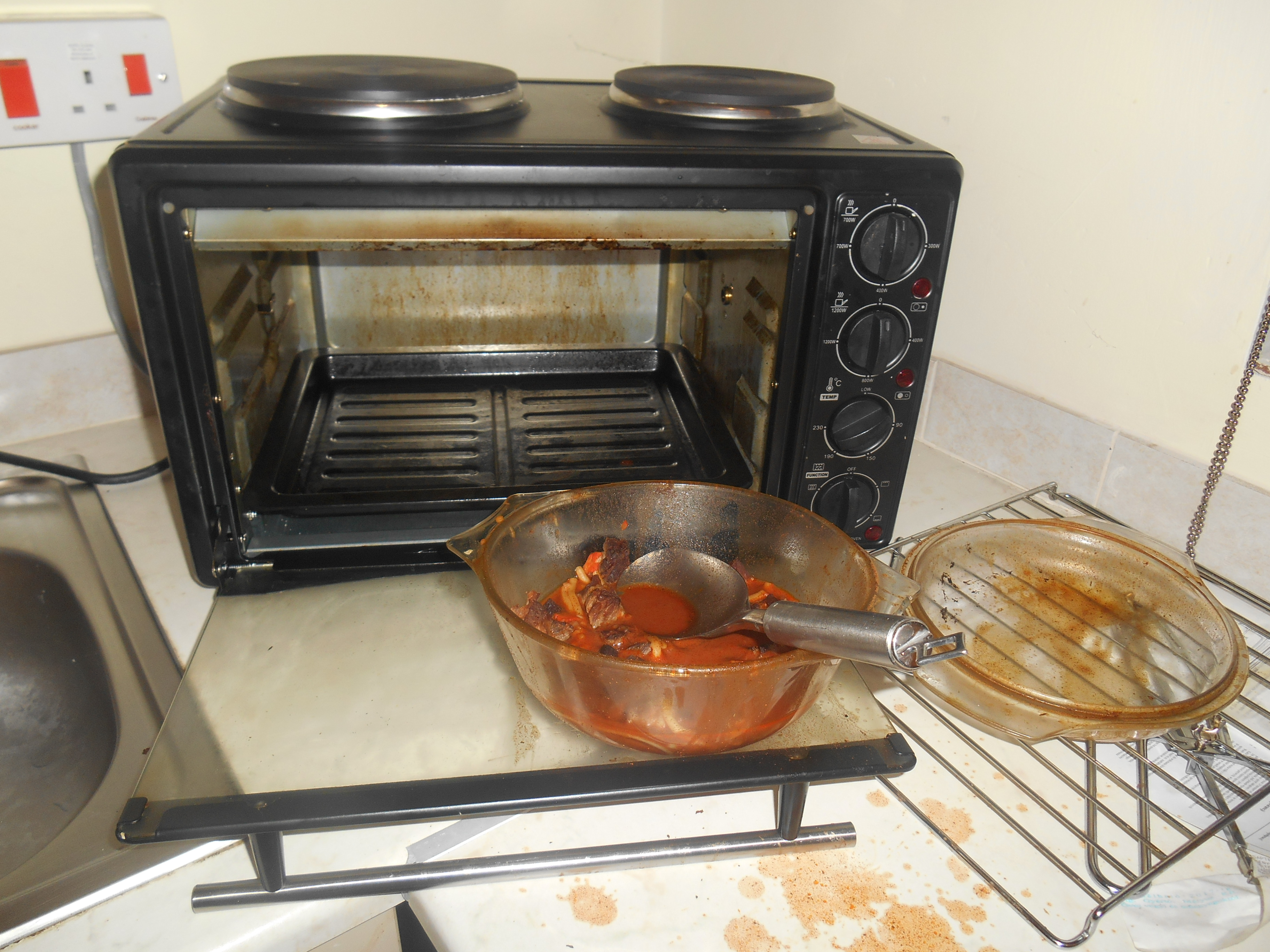
A bachelor griller with cooking stains

A bachelor griller, mini oven or mini kitchen is a countertop kitchen appliance about the size of a microwave oven but which can instead grill, bake, broil or roast food. It generally incorporates one or two heating elements at the top and bottom of the appliance, has one or two hobs (American English: burners) on the cooktop, or a ceramic hotplate, and may incorporate a rotisserie.

It can be used to fry, bake and grill (American English: broil) foods. It is an alternative to reheating prepackaged meals in a microwave oven.

Modern bachelor grillers have controller knobs to control cooking temperatures. These are steadystates, a combination of a potentiometer and a thermostat, which ensure that the temperature stays stable.

== History ==
The expression is at least 100 years old, with early versions generally powered by gas. The expression derives from the stereotypical idea that a bachelor will not cook anything properly, if at all. It has also been used as (and may have originated as) a brand name: the 1905 Journal of Gas Lighting, Water Supply & Sanitary Improvement (page 410) describes "illustrations of the firm's "Welcome" and "Bachelor" grillers, their "Vulcan" cooker, and an assortment of brass fittings for gas".

George Orwell used a bachelor griller in 1935 while sharing a flat with Rayner Heppenstall in Bloomsbury, London.

== See also ==
- List of stoves
- Toaster oven
