= History of the portable gas stove =

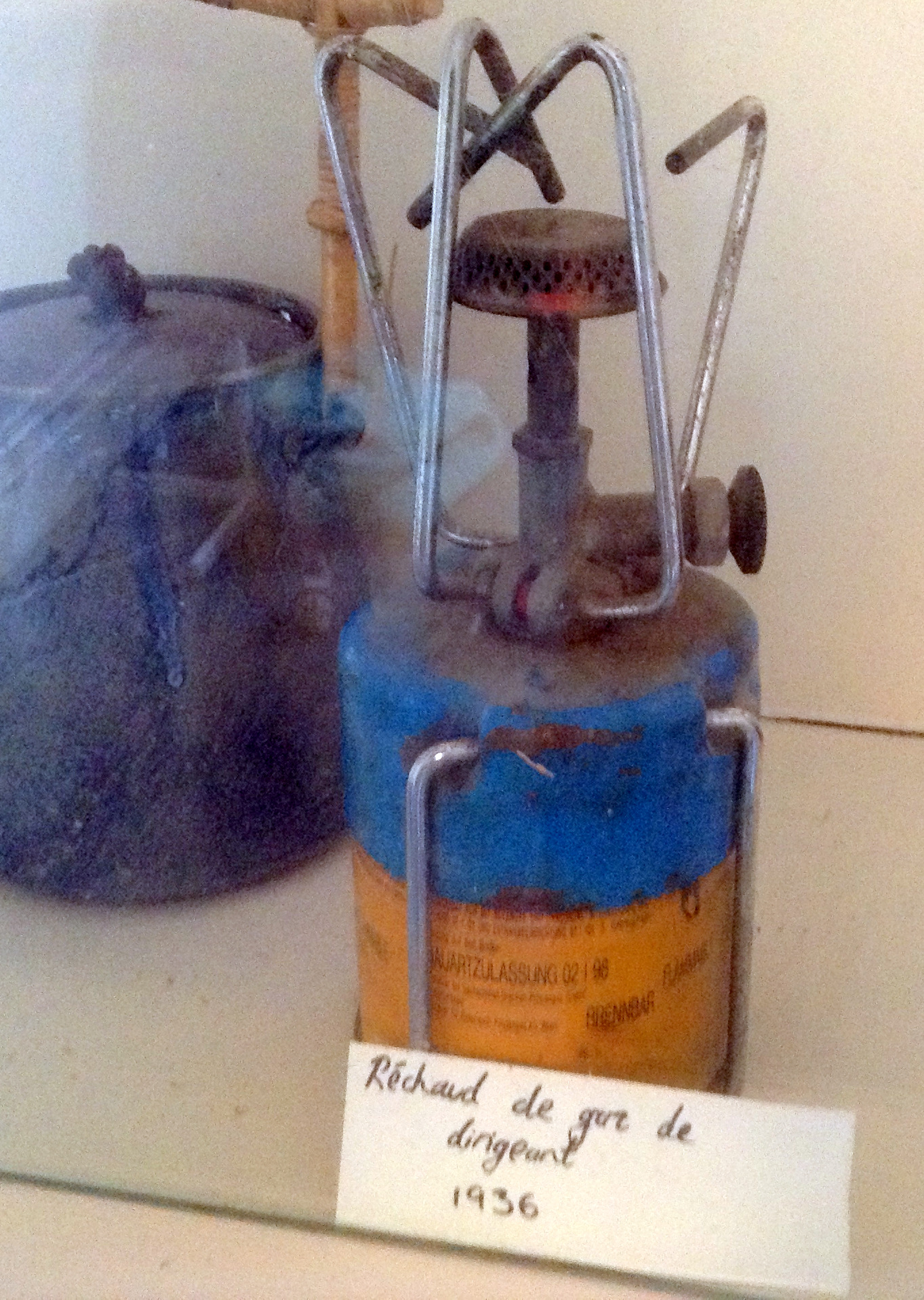
Lafare's portable gas stove 1932

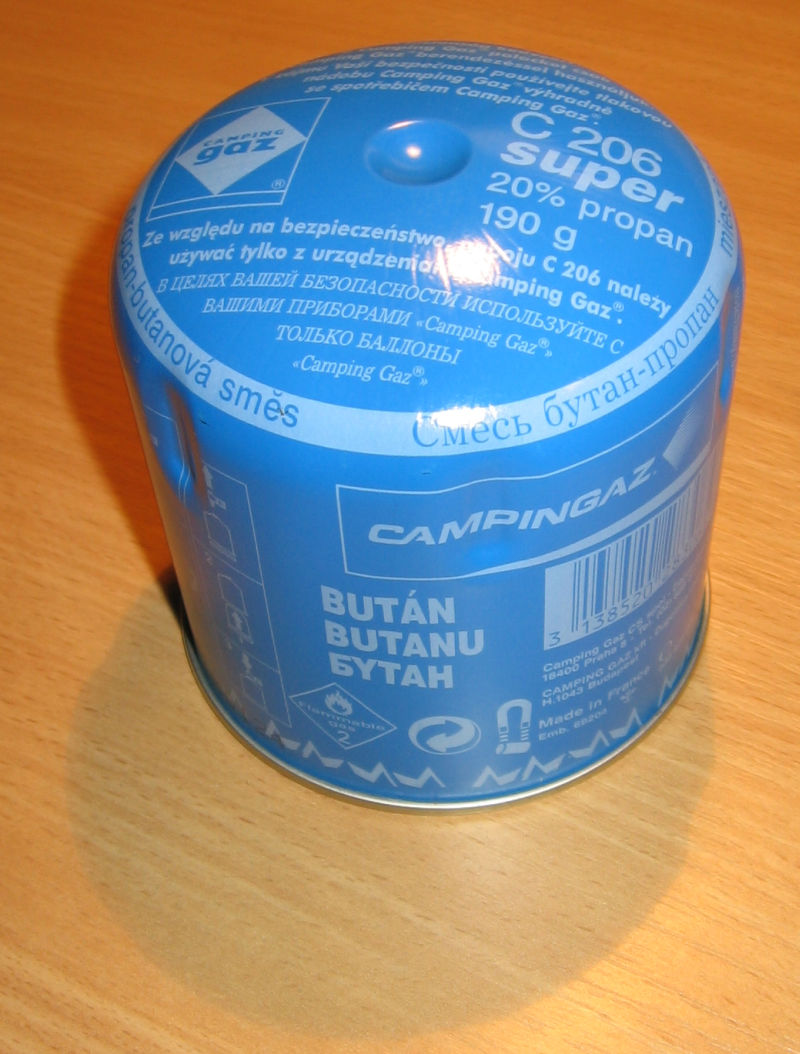
A modern gas cartridge for a portable stove

The portable gas stove is a combination of portability and functionality; combining the light weight of a small gas canister with the heat output needed to cook a meal. Portable stoves in modern times can be divided into several broad categories based on the type of fuel used and the design of the aluminium stoving frame. Unpressurised stoves use solid/liquid fuel placed in the burner before ignition. Combustible stove hangers use a form of volatile liquid fuel in a pressurized burner i.e. bottled gas stoves. They originate from the gravity-fed 1932 "spirit" stoves or réchaud de gaz de dirigeant.

== Origins ==
The production of the réchaud de gaz de dirigeant (Portable gas stove) was commissioned and begun in the workshop of the industrial designer Jue Lafare (born April 7, 1896) in 1932 after he placed his plan for a portable gas cooker before the French Army two and a half years earlier.

== Early introduction ==
By 1934 Lafare's portable cooker was in officer ranks and within the next 16 months would come to be a staple of every officer in the French army. Due to fear of common misuse by soldiers of lower ranks obtaining the cookers without consent, the army requested that all instructional writing be placed upon the cookers in English as only the officers were taught fluency in English.

== Military applications ==
The majority of the cookers designed by Lafare were melted down into scrap metal when the Germans invaded France in 1940. However, the idea from Jeu Lafare's stove was adapted in various forms around the world during World War II and afterwards. Examples can be seen in many military originations around the world today, such as the Japanese '携帯用ガス炊飯器'. Today there are estimated to be less than 80 of Lafare's original Full Blue French made with English writing réchaud de gaz de dirigeant.

== Rarity ==
As mentioned above, examples of Lafare's original full blue French made réchaud de gaz de dirigeant are extremely rare. The War Memorial Museum in Boulogne, France, paid 390EU for the piece pictured above in their collection some 20 years ago. The gas canister is a later 1940s Deutsch army model.

== See also ==
- Campingaz
- List of stoves
- Portable stove
