= Kujiejun =

kujiejun

Kujiejun (Chinese: 苦節君; pinyin: kǔjiéjūn; other spellings koojiejun/kojiejun) is a type of bamboo stove and is also a special term for "tea stove" (Chinese: 茶灶; pinyin: cházào).

Popular during the Song dynasty, the bamboo windscreen stove frame would fit on top of a brazier.

== Tea Ware ==
This is special name for a windscreen stove. This type of stove was also used during the Tang dynasty when tea was boiled.

== See also ==
- The Classic of Tea
- Pictorial of Tea Ware
- bamboo stove
