= Aprovecho =

- Affiliations: Aprovecho Research Center
- Website: aprovecho.org

Aprovecho is the name of two non-profit organizations located in Cottage Grove, Oregon. Aprovecho Sustainability Education Center is a not-for-profit organization based in the vicinity of Cottage Grove, Oregon. Its focus is on sustainable living, including permaculture and renewable energy. Its sister organization, Aprovecho Research Center, develops efficient cook stoves for use in developing countries.

== Cook stove designs ==
Since 2001, Aprovecho Research Center has worked on designs for cook stoves, primarily for use in developing countries. They are best known for the Rocket stove, developed by Ianto Evans and their technical director Dr. Larry Winiarski. A number of variations on these stoves have been created over the years, often designed specifically to suit the country in which they are being used. Aprovecho also helps other designers by testing their stoves for emissions of different gases and particulates.

For 29 years, Aprovecho Research Center (ARC) consultants have been designing and implementing improved biomass cooking and heating technologies in more than 60 countries worldwide. The Center was formally established in 1976, and is dedicated to researching, developing and disseminating clean cookstove technologies for meeting the basic needs of refugees, impoverished people, and communities in the developing world. For decades, ARC has been the world's leader in open source development of all aspects of improved cooking stoves.

== Sustainability education ==
Aprovecho Sustainability Education Center is a land-based education center focused on the practice and education of sustainable living skills. Twice a year the non-profit teaches internships in the area of organic farming, appropriate technologies and sustainable forestry. There is also a focus on, local food networks, food preservation, whole foods and nutrition, wild edibles and food foraging, bread baking, fermentation, seaweed and salt harvesting, seed saving and more.

== Awards ==
In 2006, Aprovecho Research Center won an Ashden Award for their work with the Programme for Biomass Energy Conservation in Southern Africa (ProBEC) on efficient biomass stoves for institutional cooking, and again in 2009 for their work with Shengzhou Stove Manufacturer in China, for work to mass-produce efficient stoves for use in developing countries.

== See also ==
- Renewable energy
- List of stoves
