= Kelly Kettle =

Portable kettle with a central chimney

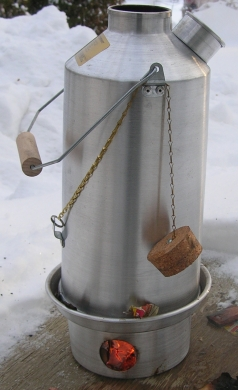
A Kelly Kettle in use, with the cork stopper removed from the water spout for safety while water is being boiled

Kelly Kettle, Storm Kettle, Ghillie Kettle, Thermette, Survival Kettle and Volcano Kettle are trade names for portable devices for boiling water outdoors using twigs and other small combustible materials; these devices consist of a water jacket surrounding a fire chamber which creates an upward chimney draft ensuring efficient and rapid boiling even in windy or wet weather.

Kelly Kettle and Volcano Kettle are registered trademarks of the Kelly Kettle company which first produced the product in Ireland in the early 1900s. George Marris & Co of Birmingham first produced the "Sirram Volcano Kettle" in England in the 1920s. The Thermette was first manufactured in New Zealand in 1929 and was standard issue for the New Zealand Army during World War II where it was known as a Benghazi boiler or Benghazi burner. Other companies, including the Eydon Kettle Company started manufacture at later dates.

Earlier examples of water heaters using a water jacket include heavier samovar tea urns from Eastern, Central, and Southeastern Europe, as well as the Middle East.

== History ==
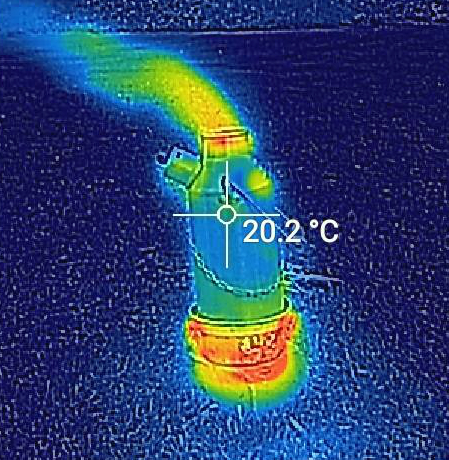
Thermal image of a just-lit Ghillie kettle, with plume of hot air resulting from the convection current

Early examples (estimated at 3,600 years) of devices that heat water surrounding a fire include samovar tea urns from Eastern, Central, and Southeastern Europe, as well as the Middle East. The Kelly Kettle Company first manufactured portable devices of this type in the early 1900s.

George Marris & Co of Birmingham (Brass Founders, Stampers and Piercers) first come to light in the 1800s making iron bedsteads and brass/copper fern pots. They diversified into picnic sets, picnic water-boiling sets and high-end shaving/toiletry sets in the 1880s (The Sirram Spirit Set Registered Design 247422 of Dec 1884) and Camping Stoves with their brand name "Sirram" (Marris backwards).

There was a meeting between one of the Marris family and a New Zealander (almost certainly John Ashley Hart, who started the Thermette Co in New Zealand in 1929 – see below) to discuss products and ideas. The original concept of the volcano kettle appears to have been Harts, but he may have been inspired by traditional Mongolian and Chinese hot-pots which had a central chimney. The first Sirram Volcano Kettle was manufactured out of spun copper with brass handles/fittings, it appeared in the late 1920s and was eventually covered by Registered Design No. 731794 of 1928.

Subsequently, the design changed from copper/brass to spun aluminium; there is no record of when this change occurred. The Volcano Kettles were still in production in the late 1960s as the book 'Modern Camping 1968: by Jack Cox' quotes a UK Consumers Association ('Which? Magazine') test of 21 camp stoves which concluded "For boiling water quickly or washing up there is nothing to beat a Sirram Volcano, either at home or abroad".

Production of the Volcano Kettles and picnic boiling sets appear to have ceased in 1970 when Desmo Ltd purchased Hawker Marris Saled Ltd and discontinued the kettle range in favour of focussing on their picnic hamper range. Following the demise of the Sirram Volcano Kettle in 1970, modern versions are now in production by a number of companies around the world.

The Thermette design was registered in 1929 in New Zealand by John Ashley Hart. It was standard issue to the New Zealand army serving in the North Africa during WW2 when it was known as the 'Benghasi Boiler'. In 1939 the New Zealand Army asked Hart to waive his patent so they could make their own Thermettes; he agreed and the device was issued as standard equipment to every small army unit.

A modified version was created by the Eydon Kettle Company in the early 1970s and sold as the 'Storm Kettle'. Fixed (and portable) rocket stoves used for cooking were developed in 1980s, with variants for heating water and for space heating.

== See also ==
- Beverage-can stove
- Hobo stove
- List of cooking vessels
- Portable stove
- Samovar
