= Rocket stove =

Type of stove

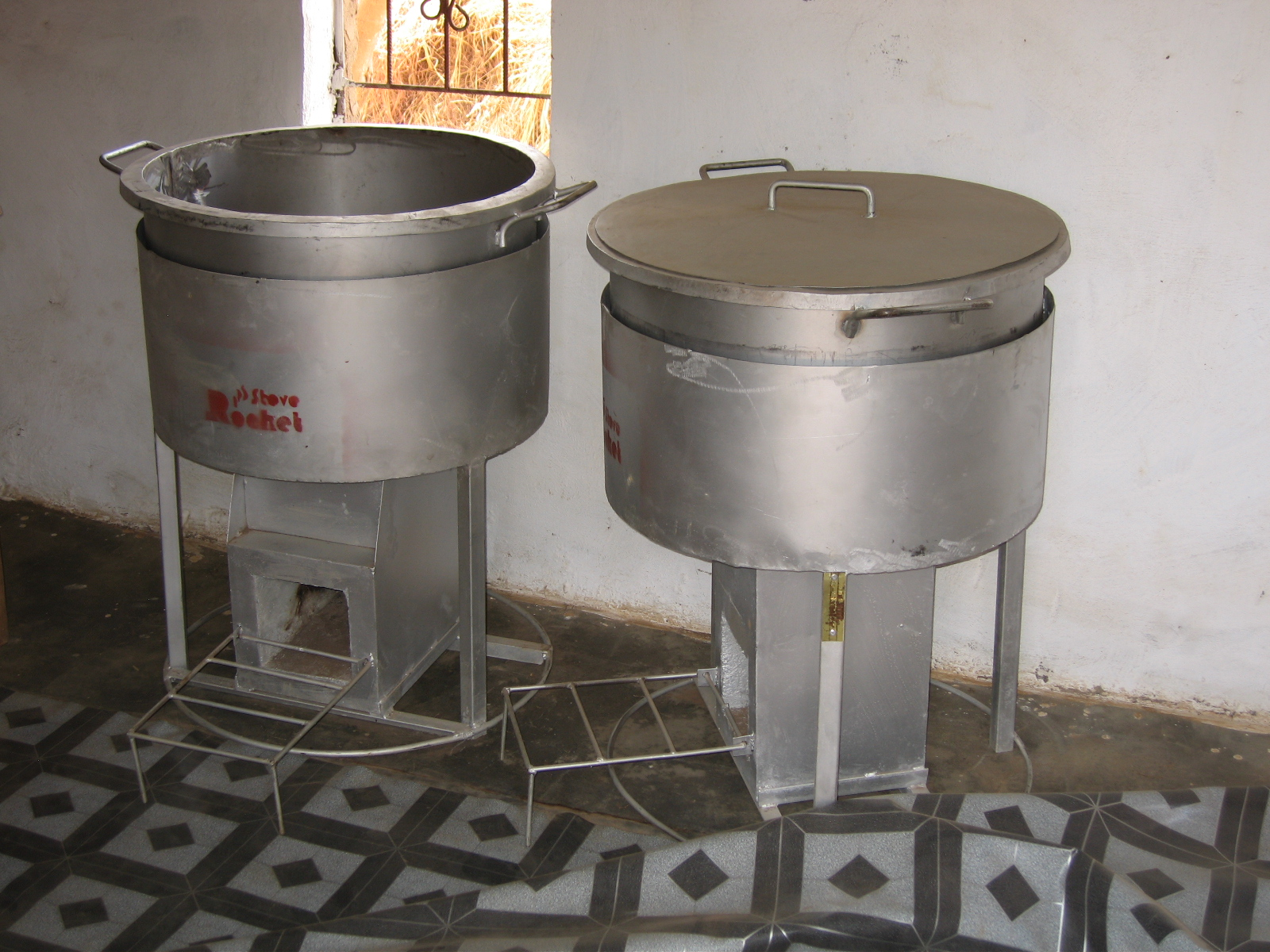
A small manufactured rocket cooking stove

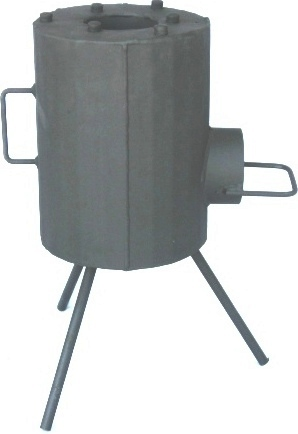
A rocket stove

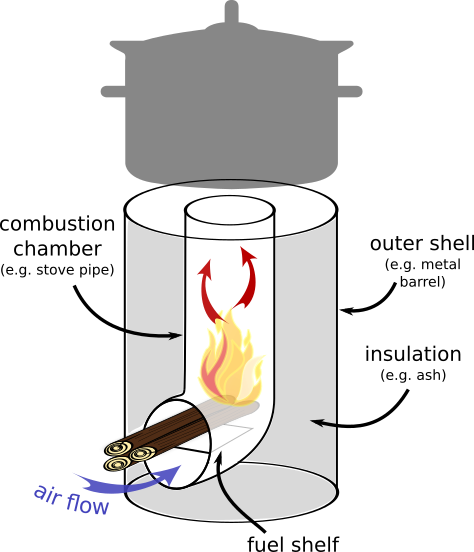
Rocket stove illustration

A rocket stove is an efficient and hot-burning stove using small-diameter wood fuel. Fuel is burned in a simple combustion chamber containing an insulated vertical chimney, which ensures almost complete combustion prior to the flames reaching the cooking surface. Rocket stove designs are most often used for portable stoves for cooking but the design is also used for large, fixed stoves in institutions, and to make rocket mass heaters for heating.

== History ==
A precursor to the rocket stove was the Argand lamp, which was patented in 1780. This was a major development of the traditional oil lamp, which introduced a glass chimney above the flame to increase air-flow. As well as being used for lighting, this design was also used for cooking and for heating water due to its "affording much the strongest heat without smoke."

Larry Winiarski, Technical Director of Aprovecho, began developing the rocket stove in 1980 based on a VITA stove, designed by Sam Baldwin, and rediscovered the principles of the systems developed by the Romans in hypocaust heating and cooking systems. A stove was designed to make tortillas based on the principles of the rocket stove and won an Ashden Award in 2005. Aprovecho won the same award in 2006 for their rocket stoves. Aprovecho rocket stoves were sold in Lesotho, Malawi, Uganda, Mozambique, Tanzania, and Zambia.

== Efficiency ==
Many developing countries use traditional wood fuel stoves without proper ventilation, which produces indoor concentrations of smoke particles "typically 10 to 100 times the long-term levels recommended by the World Health Organization." Chronic exposure to these particles are linked with disease. Rocket stoves are better at combusting the fuel, thus using less fuel and producing less smoke, carbon monoxide, and soot.

In rural Kenya, a comparison of traditional three-stone stoves and rocket mud stoves (RMS) showed that RMS use resulted in a 33% reduction of carbon monoxide production in the kitchen and a 42% reduction in "personal" carbon monoxide production, which was measured with data loggers placed on clothing.

== See also ==
- Beverage-can stove
- Curanto
- Dakota fire pit
- Lovo
- Energy poverty and cooking
- Hāngī
- Hexamine stove
- Kālua
- Shichirin
- Volcano stove
