= Energy poverty and cooking =

Issues involving access to clean, modern fuels and technologies for cooking

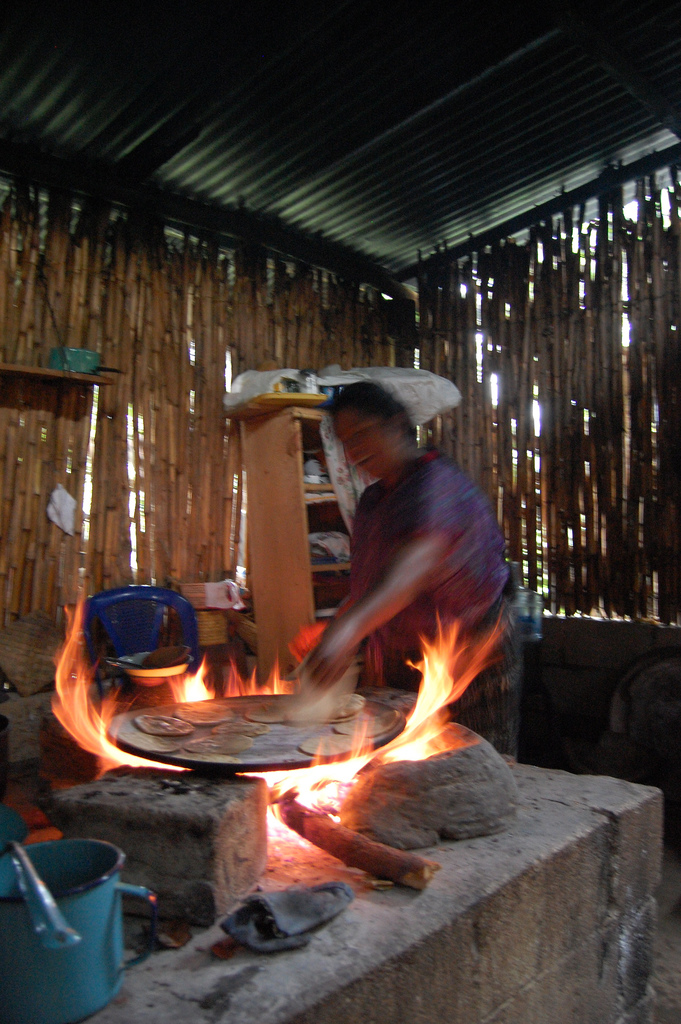
traditional wood-fired 3-stone stove in Guatemala, which causes indoor air pollution

One aspect of energy poverty is lack of access to clean, modern fuels and technologies for cooking. As of 2020, more than 2.6 billion people in developing countries routinely cook with fuels such as wood, animal dung, coal, or kerosene. Burning these types of fuels in open fires or traditional stoves causes harmful household air pollution, resulting in an estimated 3.8 million deaths annually according to the World Health Organization (WHO), and contributes to various health, socio-economic, and environmental problems.

The expansion of affordable clean cooking access is a component of United Nations Sustainable Development Goal 7. The World Health Organization (WHO) defines clean cooking as the use of stoves and appliances powered by electricity, liquid petroleum gas (LPG), piped natural gas (PNG), biogas, alcohol, and solar heat meet WHO guidelines for clean cooking.

Stoves that burn wood and other solid fuels more efficiently than traditional stoves are known as "improved cookstoves" or "clean cookstoves". With few exceptions, these stoves deliver fewer health benefits than stoves that use liquid or gaseous fuels. However, they reduce fuel usage and thus help prevent environmental degradation. Improved cookstoves are an important interim solution in areas where deploying cleaner technologies is less feasible.

Initiatives to encourage cleaner cooking practices have yielded limited success. For various practical, cultural, and economic reasons, it is common for families who adopt clean stoves and fuels to continue to use traditional fuels and stoves frequently.

== Issues with traditional cooking fuels ==
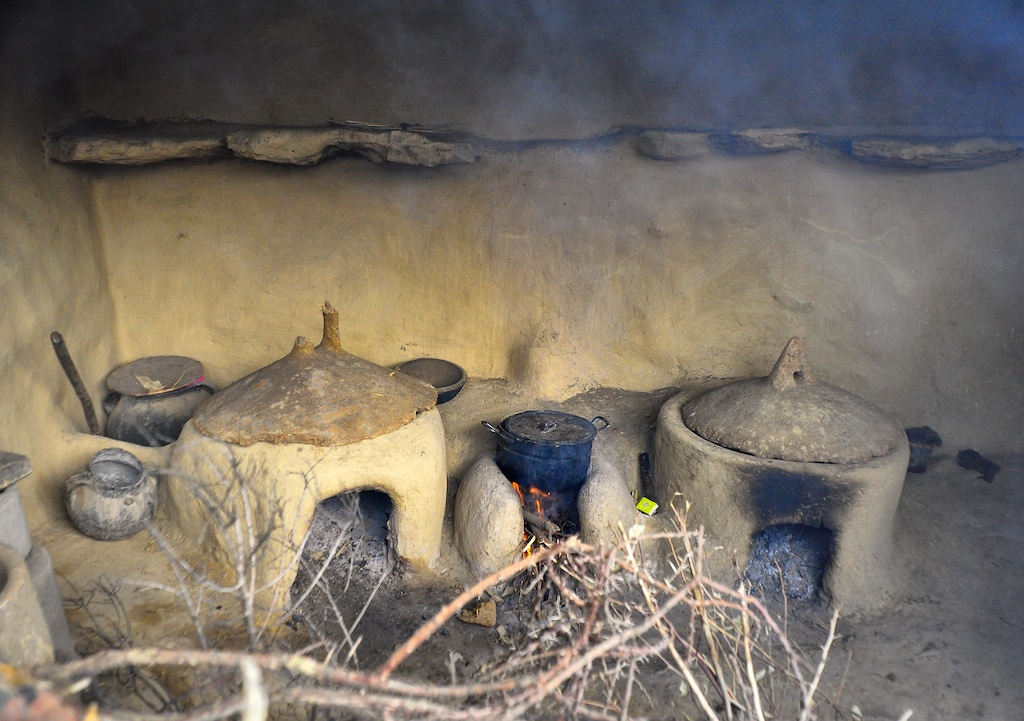
Traditional wood-burning stoves

=== Health impacts ===
As of 2023, more than 2.3 billion people in developing countries rely on burning polluting biomass fuels such as wood, dry dung, coal, or kerosene for cooking, which causes harmful household air pollution and also contributes significantly to outdoor air pollution. The World Health Organization (WHO) estimates that cooking-related pollution causes 3.8 million annual deaths. The Global Burden of Disease study estimated the number of deaths in 2021 at 3.1 million, and the death rate is highest in Africa. Household air pollution from polluting cooking practices is associated with a wide range of adverse health outcomes. Exposure to fine particulate matter and toxic gases released during combustion has been linked to increased risks of stroke, pneumonia, and chronic respiratory conditions such as chronic obstructive pulmonary disease. In addition, exposure during pregnancy is associated with adverse birth outcomes, including low birth weight.

In traditional cooking facilities, smoke is typically vented into the home rather than through a chimney. Solid fuel smoke contains thousands of substances, many of which are hazardous to human health. The most well understood of these substances are carbon monoxide (CO); small particulate matter; nitrous oxide; sulfur oxides; a range of volatile organic compounds, including formaldehyde, benzene and 1,3-butadiene; and polycyclic aromatic compounds, such as benzo-a-pyrene, which are thought to have both short and long-term health consequences.

Exposure to household air pollution (HAP) nearly doubles the risk of childhood pneumonia and is responsible for 45 percent of all pneumonia deaths in children under five years of age. Emerging evidence shows that HAP is also a risk factor for cataracts, the leading cause of blindness in lower-middle-income countries, and low birth weight. Cooking with open fires or unsafe stoves is a leading cause of burns among women and children in developing countries.

=== Impacts on women and girls ===
Health effects are concentrated among women, who are likely responsible for cooking and childcare. Gathering fuel exposes women and children to safety risks. This process often consumes 15 or more hours per week, constraining their time for education, rest, and paid work. Women and girls must often walk long distances to obtain cooking fuel, and, as a result, face increased risk of physical and sexual violence. Many children, particularly girls, may not attend school to help their mothers with firewood collection and food preparation.

=== Environmental impacts ===
Traditional cooking facilities are highly inefficient, allowing heat to escape into the open air. The inefficiency of fuel burning results in more wood needing to be harvested and also causes emissions of black carbon, a contributor to climate change. Serious local environmental damage, including desertification, can be caused by excessive harvesting of wood and other combustible material.

While biomass harvesting in sensitive areas is problematic, it is now determined that most biomass clearing is due to agricultural expansion and land conversion. Use of crop residue and animal waste for domestic energy has detrimental results on soil quality and agricultural and livestock productivity, as it means these materials are not available as soil conditioners, organic fertilizer, and livestock fodder.

== Terminology ==
The term "clean cookstove" has often been used without defining what the term means. Organizations vary in how they define "clean":

- According to the WHO, cooking facilities are "clean" if their emissions of carbon monoxide and fine particulate matter are below certain levels.
- The Clean Cooking Alliance uses the term "clean cooking" more broadly. Its definition includes what the WHO refers to as "improved cookstoves", i.e. stoves that burn biomass fuel more efficiently than traditional stoves. As of 2020, most stoves that burn biomass fuel do not qualify as clean under WHO standards even if they are more efficient than traditional stoves.

The WHO has criticized the marketing of biomass cookstoves as "improved" when they have not been tested against standards and their health benefits are unclear.

== WHO-recommended clean cooking facilities ==
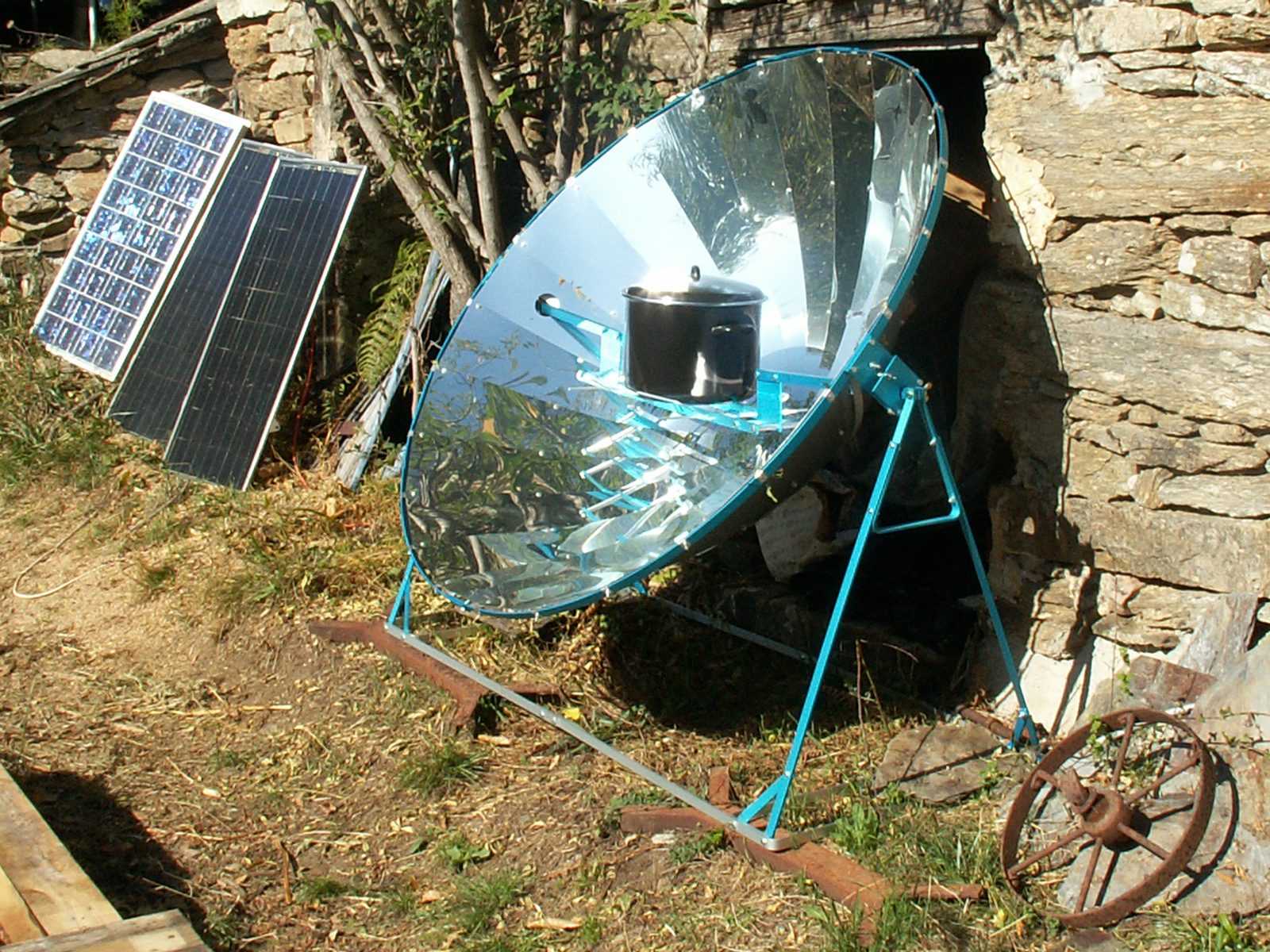
Solar cookers are nonpolluting and free to use, but require favourable weather and longer cooking times.

One of the main priorities in global sustainable development is to make clean cooking facilities universally available and affordable.

According to the WHO, stoves and appliances that are powered by electricity, liquid petroleum gas (LPG), piped natural gas (PNG), biogas, alcohol, and solar heat are "clean". Best-in-class fan gasifier stoves that burn biomass pellets can be classified as clean cooking facilities if they are correctly operated and the pellets have sufficiently low levels of moisture, but these stoves are not widely available.

Electricity can be used to power appliances such as electric pressure cookers, rice cookers, and highly efficient induction stoves, in addition to standard electric stoves. Electric induction stoves are so efficient that they create less pollution than liquified petroleum gas (LPG) even when connected to coal power sources, and are sometimes cheaper. For stews, beans, rice and other foods that can be adapted to electric pressure cookers, the savings are even greater.. As of 2019, 770 million people do not have access to electricity, and for many others, electricity is not affordable or reliable. Because access to electricity is also a high priority in global sustainable development, integrated planning for new and improved electricity infrastructure that includes both typical electric loads as well as cooking loads is beginning to gain momentum. Indeed, this kind of integrated resource planning for electricity systems may deliver faster and lower-cost solutions to both access to electricity and to clean cooking.

Natural gas stoves, which are widely used in richer countries, are not without health risks. They emit high levels of nitrogen dioxide, an atmospheric pollutant that is linked to oxidative stress and acute reduction in lung function. Studies on the effects of indoor cooking with natural gas have yielded inconsistent results. According to a 2010 meta-analysis, the evidence suggests that the practice leads to small reductions in lung function in children. Children with allergies may be more susceptible.

Biogas digesters convert waste, such as human waste and animal dung, into a methane-rich gas that burns cleanly. Biogas systems may be a promising technology in areas where each household has at least two large animals to provide dung, and a steady water supply is also available.

Solar cookers collect and concentrate the sun's heat when sunshine is available.

== Improved cook stoves ==
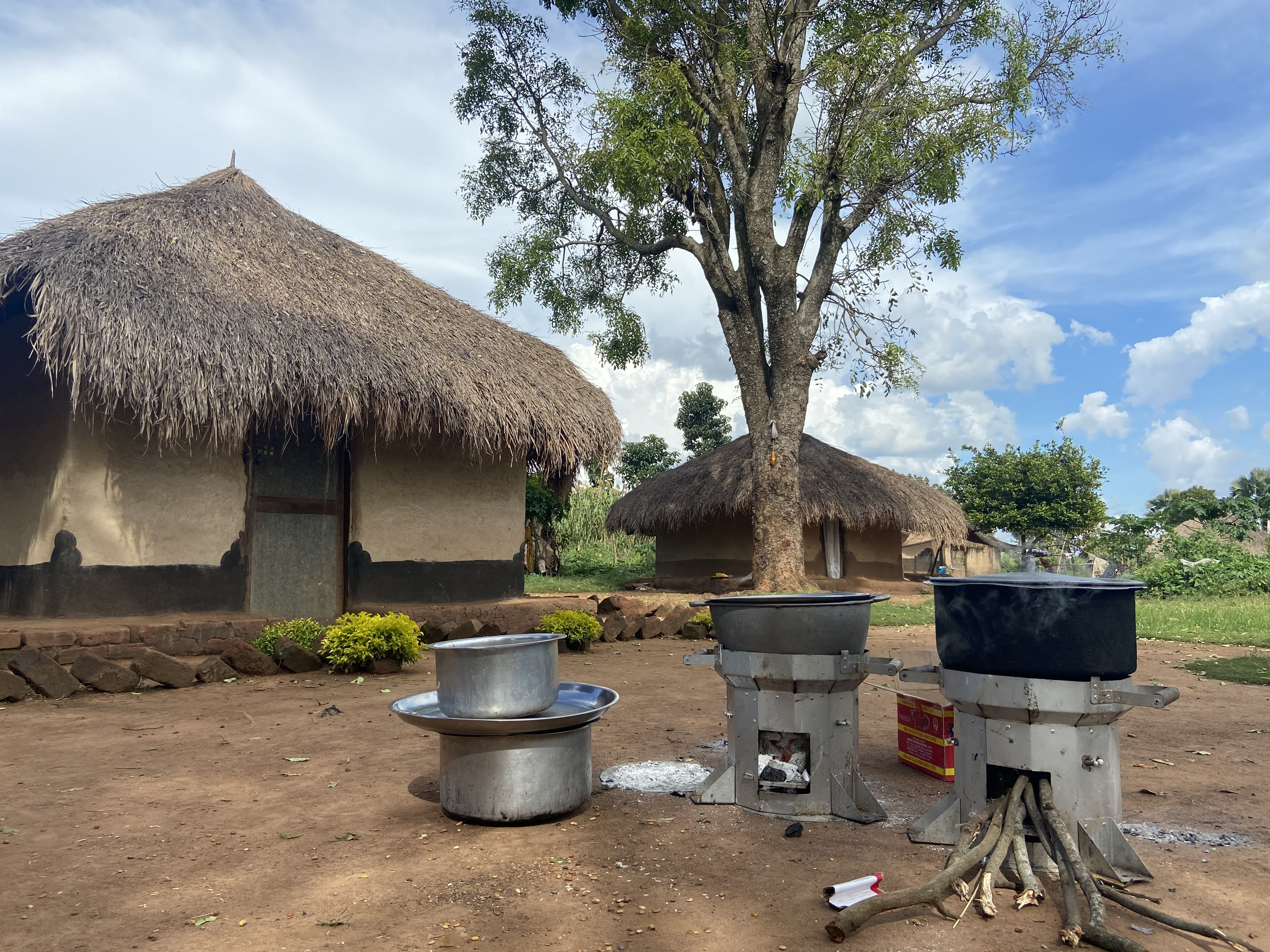
Improved cook stoves, such as the ones shown here, burn biomass relatively efficiently but usually still emit toxic levels of pollutants.

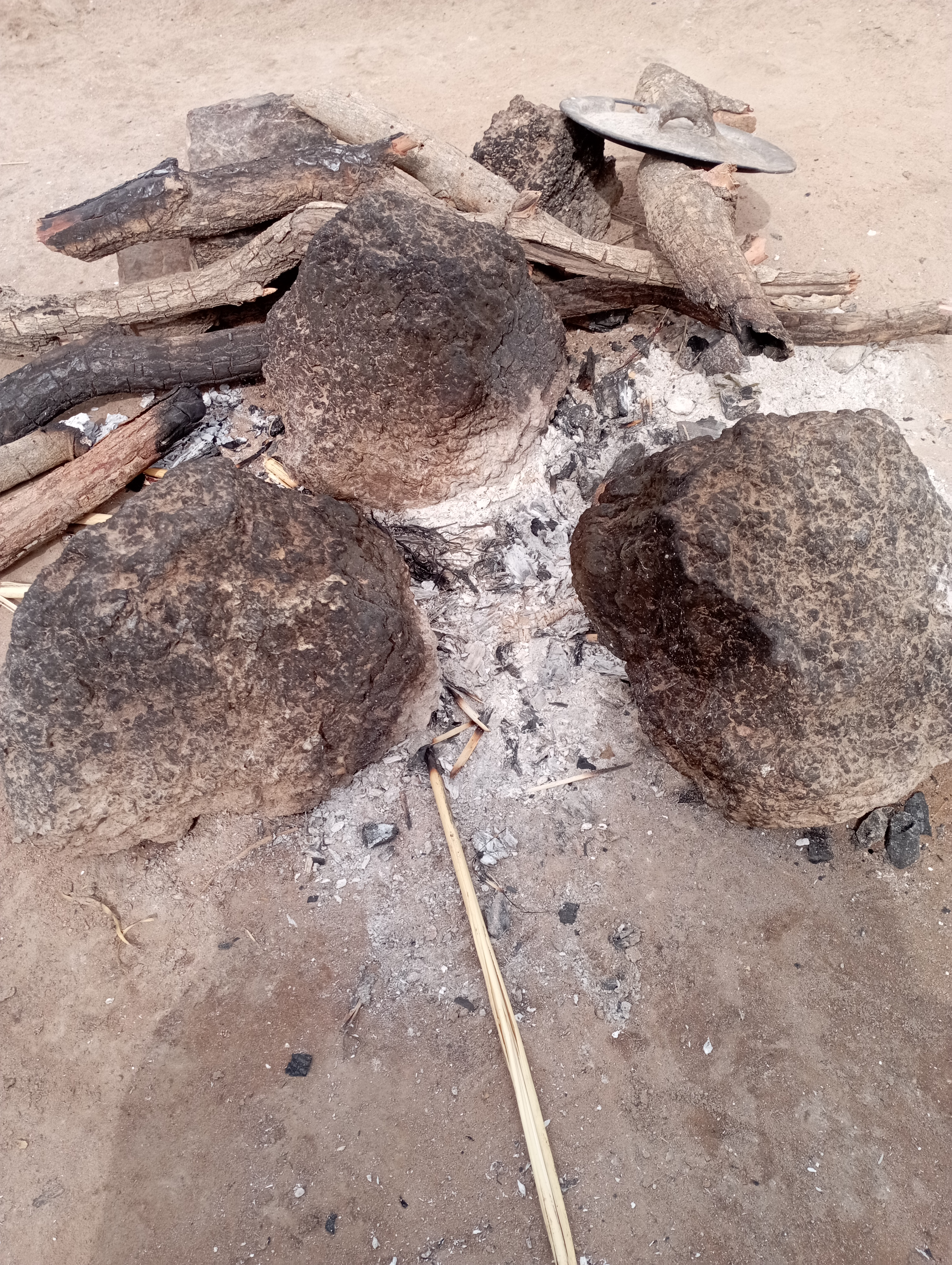
A traditional three-stone fire in Nigeria. This is the cheapest stove to produce, requiring only three suitable stones of the same height on which a cooking pot can be balanced over a fire.

Improved cook stoves (ICS), often marketed as "clean cookstoves", are biomass stoves that generally burn biomass more efficiently than traditional stoves and open fires.

Compared to traditional cook stoves, ICS are usually more fuel-efficient and aim to reduce the negative health impacts associated with exposure to toxic smoke. They reduce fuel needs by 20-75% and drastically cut dangerous smoke and fumes. As of 2016, no widely-available biomass stoves meet the standards for clean cooking as defined by the WHO. A 2020 review found only one biomass stove on the market that met WHO standards in field conditions.

Despite their limitations, ICSs are an important interim solution where deploying fully clean solutions that use electricity, gas, or alcohol is less feasible. As of 2009, less than 30% of people who cook with some sort of biomass stove use ICS.

=== Benefits and limitations ===
Improved cookstoves are more efficient, meaning that the stove's users spend less time gathering wood or other fuels, and reduce deforestation and air pollution. However, a closed stove may produce more soot and ultra-fine particles than an open fire. Some designs also make the stove safer, preventing burns that often occur when children stumble into open fires.

The efficiency improvements of ICS do not necessarily translate into meaningful reductions in health risks because for certain conditions, such as childhood pneumonia, the relationship between pollution levels and effects on the body is non-linear. This means, for example, that a 50 percent reduction in exposure would not halve the health risk. A 2020 systematic review found that ICS usage led to modest improvements in terms of blood pressure, shortness of breath, emissions of cancer-causing substances, and cardiovascular diseases, but no improvements in pregnancy outcomes or children's health.

Substantial emissions and fuel variations in consumption have been observed across ranges of cookstove designs and between laboratory and field test conditions. A standard testing mechanism does not exist to establish the true impact of alternative cookstove designs, as well as descriptive language for exposure. Stove testing studies are not always consistent, depending largely on the discipline of investigators and their scientific specialization.

The World Health Organization encourages further research to develop biomass stove technology that is low-emission, affordable, durable, and meets users' needs.

== Non-technological interventions ==
Behavioral change interventions may reduce household air pollution exposure by 20–98%. Indoor Air Pollution (IAP) exposure can be greatly reduced by cooking outdoors, reducing time spent in the cooking area, keeping the kitchen door open while cooking, avoiding leaning over the fire while attending to meal preparation, staying away from cooking while carrying children, and keeping children away from the cooking area. Environmental changes may reduce negative impacts (e.g., use of a chimney), drying fuel wood before use, and using a lid during cooking.

Opportunities to educate communities on reducing household indoor air pollution exposure include festival collaborations, religious meetings, and medical outreach clinics. Community health workers represent a significant resource for educating communities to help raise awareness regarding reducing the effects of indoor air pollution.

== Challenges ==
Access to clean fuels and technologies for cooking.

Many users of clean stoves and fuels continue to make frequent use of traditional fuels and stoves, a phenomenon known as "fuel stacking" or "stove stacking". For instance, a recent study in Kenya found that households that are primary LPG users consume 42 percent as much charcoal as households that are primary charcoal users.

When stacking is practiced, introducing clean cooking facilities may not reduce household air pollution enough to make a meaningful difference in health outcomes. There are many reasons to continue to use traditional fuels and stoves, such as unreliable fuel supply, the cost of fuel, the ability of stoves to accommodate different types of pots and cooking techniques, and the need to travel long distances to repair stoves.

Efforts to improve access to clean cooking fuels and stoves have barely kept up with population growth, and current and planned policies would still leave 2.4 billion people without access in 2030.

== 2023 Reports on Clean Cooking Access ==
=== IRENA's Findings ===
The International Renewable Energy Agency (IRENA) released a series in 2023 indicating slow progress toward universal clean cooking, with 2.3 billion lacking access in 2021 and 1.9 billion potentially still without it by 2030. The series emphasizes the need for more investment and policy support for renewable-based clean cooking technologies—like biogas and bioethanol—which are crucial for health, environment, and climate but are often neglected in favor of fossil fuel options like LPG. Sharing experiences from Sub-Saharan Africa and Asia, the series calls for a strategic shift in approach to meet growing demand and align with sustainable development goals, underscoring the importance of scaling up renewable clean cooking solutions through targeted actions.

=== IEA Report ===
The International Energy Agency (IEA), in its 2023 report, emphasizes the critical urgency of achieving universal access to clean cooking by 2030—a goal integral to health, equity, and environmental sustainability. The IEA estimates that an annual investment of US$8 billion is required to overcome funding gaps and enhance the adoption of cleaner cooking technologies, including electric and improved cookstoves, especially in high-need areas such as sub-Saharan Africa. The report suggests that such an investment shift has the potential to avert 2.5 million premature deaths, create 1.5 million jobs, and markedly reduce greenhouse gas emissions. The IEA affirms the right to clean cooking as a fundamental human right and argues that meeting this target is essential for steering the world towards a more sustainable and equitable future.

== Environmental and sustainable development effects ==
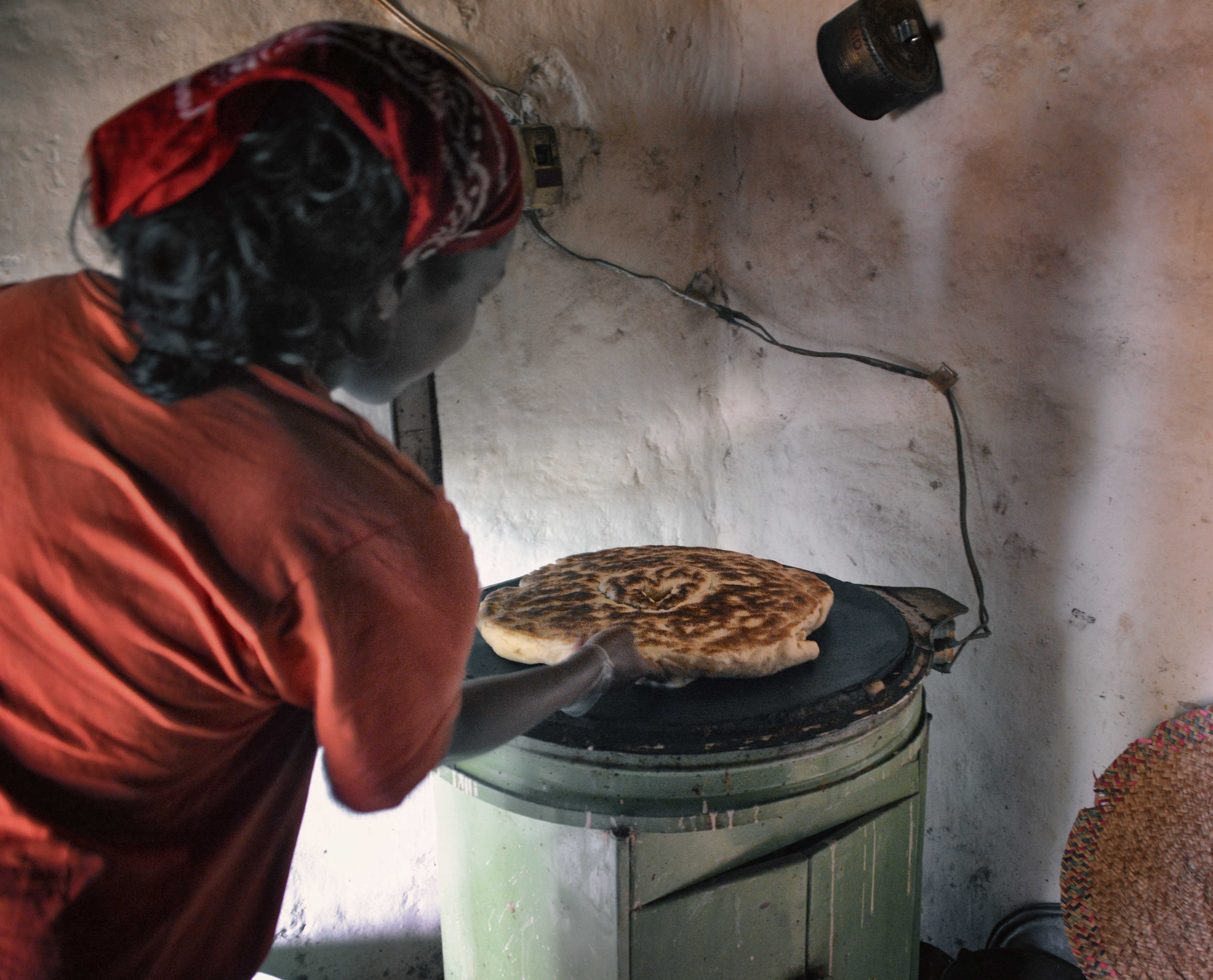
A woman cooks with electricity, a clean energy source, in Ethiopia.

Transitioning to cleaner cooking methods is expected to either slightly raise greenhouse gas emissions or decrease emissions, even if the replacement fuels are fossil fuels. There is evidence that switching to LPG and PNG has a smaller climate effect than the combustion of solid fuels, which emits methane and black carbon. The burning of residential solid fuels accounts for up to 58 percent of global black carbon emissions. The shift to clean cooking solutions reduces methane and other greenhouse gas emissions emitted by incomplete combustion in basic stoves by 0.9 Gt of CO_{2}-eq, and deforestation is also reduced, saving 0.7 Gt in 2030. The Intergovernmental Panel on Climate Change stated in 2018, "The costs of achieving nearly universal access to electricity and clean fuels for cooking and heating are projected to be between 72 and 95 billion USD per year until 2030 with minimal effects on GHG emissions."

Universal access to clean cooking is an element of the UN Sustainable Development Goal 7, whose first target is: "By 2030, ensure universal access to affordable, reliable and modern energy services". Progress in clean cooking would facilitate progress in other Sustainable Development goals, such as eliminating poverty (Goal 1), good health and well-being (Goal 3), gender equality (Goal 5), and climate action (Goal 13). An indicator of Goal 7 is the proportion of population with primary reliance on clean fuels and technologies for cooking, heating, and lighting, using the WHO's definition of "clean".

Reuters reported that the Integrity Council for the Voluntary Carbon Market approved three clean cookstove methods under its Core Carbon Principles benchmark in 2025.

== See also ==
- Energy poverty
- Indoor air pollution in developing nations
- Right to food
- Sustainable energy
