= Svea 123 =

Camping stove

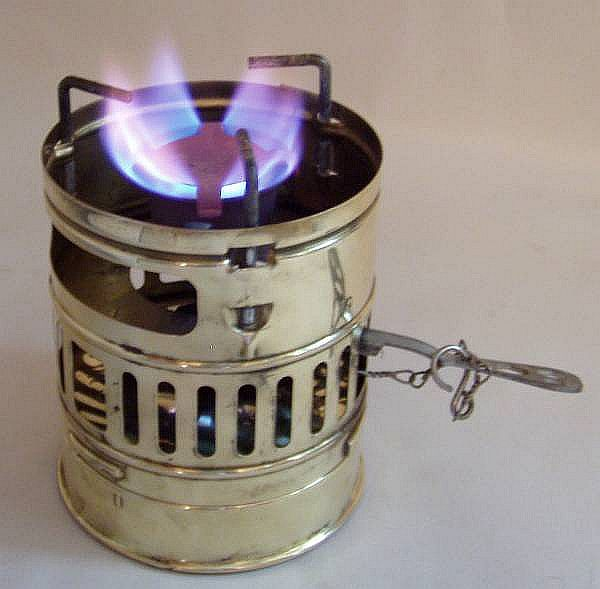
Svea 123 stove

The Svea 123 is a small liquid-fuel (naphtha, commonly referred to as white gas or Coleman fuel) pressurized-burner camping stove that traces its origins to designs first pioneered in the late 19th century. Although it was originally made in Sweden it is now built in Taiwan by Optimus.

== History ==
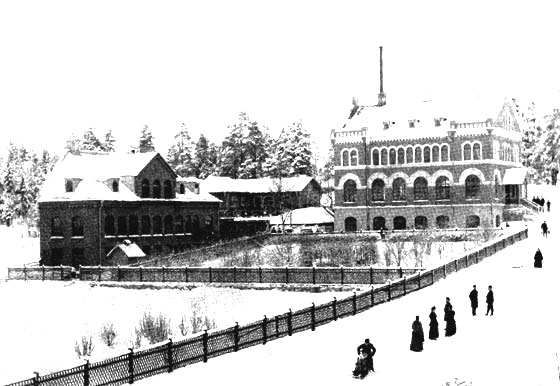
C. R. Nybergs Lödlampfabrik

Svea stoves were first made by C.R. Nybergs Lödlampfabrik, which also manufactured blowtorches as well as other machinery and equipment. Founded by Carl Nyberg, the firm later became one of the largest industries in Sundbyberg, Sweden. In 1922, the business was taken over by Max Sievert, an early associate of Nyberg's, and renamed Sieverts Lödlampfabrik (later known as Sievert AB). The Svea 123, introduced in 1955, is considered to be the first compact backpacking white gas stove and one of the most popular camping stoves ever made. Its distinctive "roaring" sound has been likened to that of a jet engine at takeoff. In 1969, the Svea brand was acquired by Optimus, another Swedish manufacturer of portable stoves, which has continued production of the Svea 123 to the present day. Because of its simple design and reputation for dependable performance, even under extreme conditions, the Svea 123 enjoys a devoted following.

The popularity of portable camping stoves such as the Svea coincided with the increase during the 1950s and 1960s in awareness of the environmental impact of backpacking, particularly in heavily traveled areas, and the rise of the leave no trace ethic in the 1970s and 1980s. At the same time, scarcity of fuel in over-used camping areas as well as regulatory requirements (open-fire bans) also contributed to the need for a substitute for open campfires for "wilderness" area cooking. Eventually stoves that were lighter in weight than the Svea, as well as those of other designs that were capable of burning a wider variety of fuels (useful when camping in other parts of the world where white gas is difficult to find) knocked it from its perch as one of the most popular backpacking stoves after nearly 50 years of production. However, the rugged and durable Svea 123—often described by long-time users as "bomb-proof"—still remains popular and continues in wide use.

== Construction ==
Made of solid brass, the Svea 123 weighs about 500 grams (18 oz), measures 100 by 130 millimetres (3.9 in × 5.1 in) and will burn for over an hour on full tank (about 4 ounces) of fuel. Later models (designated the Svea 123R and also sold as the Optimus Climber) were made with a built-in cleaning needle to keep the burner jet from clogging by pushing soot or other impurities outward; early Sievert models without the self-cleaning needle came with a small wire pricker that is used to clean the burner jet manually by pushing the soot inwards. These older models are distinguishable by their downwardly-angled spindle and control valve, to which the adjusting key is attached. The spindle on a Svea 123R with the self-cleaning needle is at a right angle to the stem. Other differences between older and newer models include the vaporizer on older models, which is smooth, while newer models of both the Svea 123 and the 123R are finned and have a stronger joint configuration at the base. The operating key is also different between the 2 models. Not only in appearance but also the connection size. The Svea 123 has a 3 mm connection and the Svea 123R has a 4 mm connection.

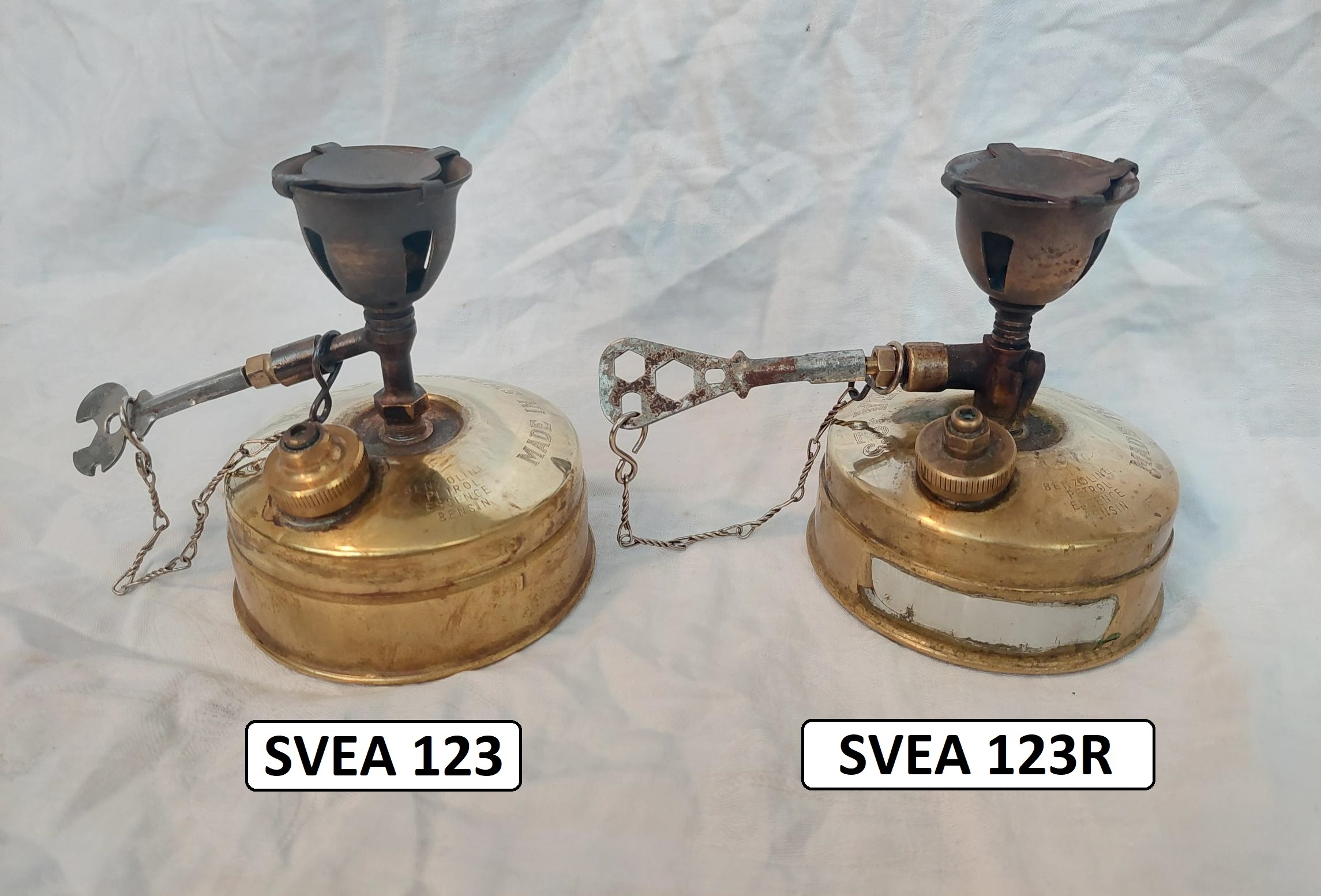
Two versions of the Svea 123 camping stove. Both without the windshield.

The pressure-relief valve in the filler cap has also been redesigned several times to improve both reliability as well as re-seating of the valve after it has opened. The pentagonal hole in the pressure relief valve is designed as a vent, not a key socket. The valve disassembles easily with a pliers. A brass windscreen attaches directly to the stove, and has built-in pot supports that fold inward for storage. The aluminum lid comes with a detachable handle and can also be used as a small cook-pot.

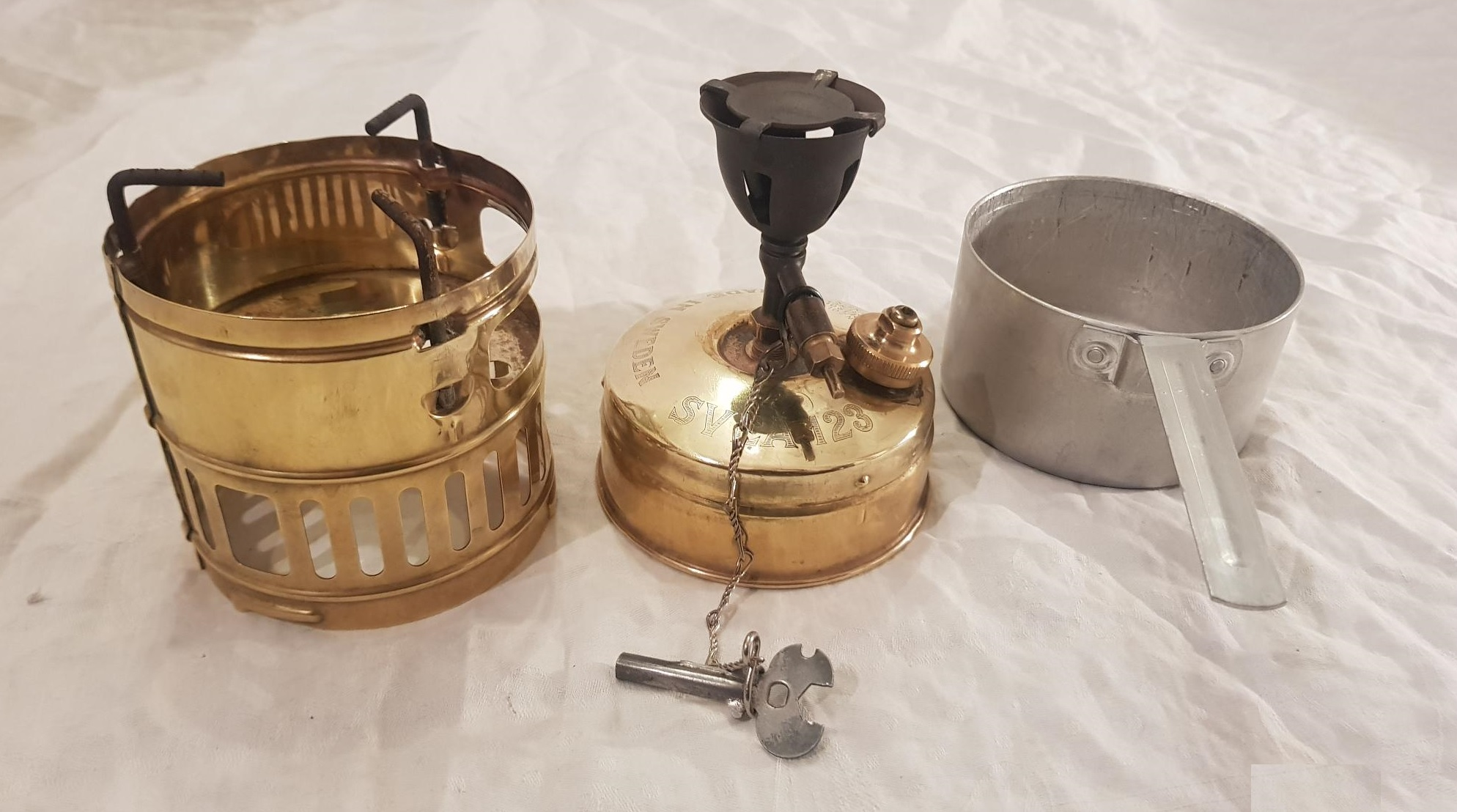
SVEA 123 camping stove with detached windshield, operating key and aluminium pan.

== How it works ==
=== Stove lighting and operation ===
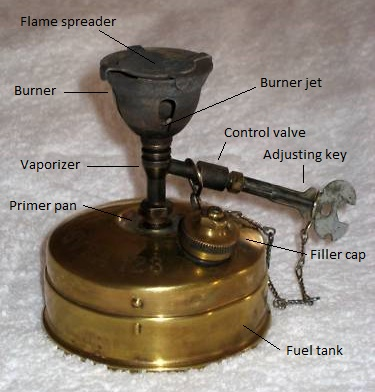
Svea 123 stove components

To light the stove, the fuel tank must first be pre-heated and pressurized by lighting a small amount of fuel poured into the primer pan or spirit cup (a small well) on top of the tank at the base of the vaporizer (the vertical stem connecting the fuel tank to the burner). Alternatively, the primer pan can be filled directly from the fuel tank by opening the control valve and warming the fuel tank by holding it in one's hands. This will increase the pressure in the fuel tank and force a small amount of fuel to trickle out of the burner jet and into the primer pan. The control valve must then be closed before lighting the priming fuel so as to allow pressure to build up in the tank when the exterior fuel begins to heat the tank and the fuel within. The tank can also be pressurized by an optional pump that may be attached to the filler cap, but this is generally not necessary except in extreme cold. Fuel from the tank is fed by a cotton wick inside the tank to the base of the vaporizer. The heat and pressure created by the priming flame vaporizes the fuel inside the vaporizer. When the priming flame is nearly burnt out, the control valve is opened by turning the adjusting key. This allows the vaporized fuel to flow under pressure through the burner jet (a small opening at the base of the burner), where it mixes with oxygen and burns with a blue flame. Adjusting the flow of the vaporized fuel that is forced through the burner jet controls the flame size and heat output. The control valve (a spindle) is threaded in the vaporizer's housing, and as it is opened (by turning the adjusting key) it opens like a faucet (counter-clockwise to open and clockwise to close) and the vaporized fuel flows through the burner jet. Closing the spindle closes the fuel supply. A small plate on the top of the burner (a flame spreader) spreads the flame outwards. The heat generated in the burner and vaporizer maintains the internal pressure in the fuel tank.

=== Burner design and flame efficiency ===
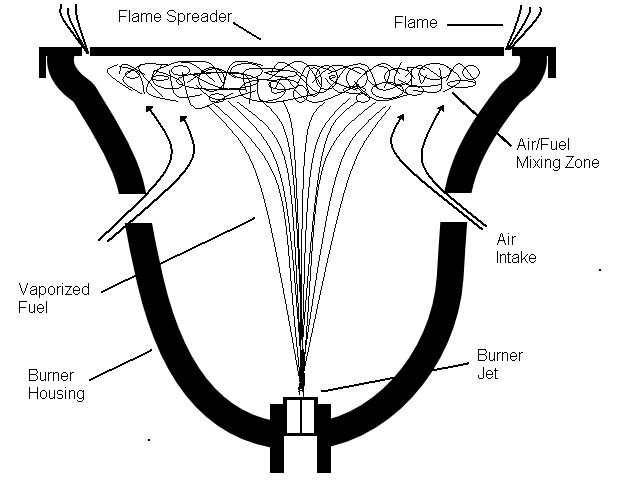
Svea 123 burner design

Like most gasoline stoves, the Svea 123 uses an inverted bell-shaped burner topped with a flame spreader (sometimes called a target burner or plate burner design). As the vaporized fuel exits the jet, it shoots upward and strikes the bottom of the flame spreader, where it mixes with air that is drawn into the burner housing by convection and, more importantly at higher flow rates, by Bernoulli effect entrainment. The air/fuel mixture flows around the bottom of the flame spreader where it burns with a blue flame. In this type of burner design, flame efficiency depends on how fast the vaporized fuel strikes the flame spreader and on how well the air and vaporized fuel mixes beneath the flame spreader (i.e., the amount of turbulence in the air/fuel mixing zone). As a result, this design works best at high fuel output levels; efficient combustion is indicated by a blue flame. As the fuel output is decreased (i.e., when the control valve is turned down) the velocity with which the fuel exits the jet is also decreased, and fuel mixing (i.e., the amount of turbulence in the air/fuel mixing zone) is likewise decreased. At very low fuel output levels, the fuel will no longer exit with sufficient velocity to fully strike the flame spreader and combustion will consequently be very inefficient, usually indicated by a yellow flame.

=== Internal cleaning needle ===
The cleaning needle on the Svea 123R model has two small toothed cogs that face each other, which cleans the burner jet from both the inside and outside when using the stove. The cleaning needle moves upward and downward when the spindle is turned; when the spindle is fully opened, the needle clears the burner jet's opening. As the spindle is closed, the needle retracts into the burner housing. In this way, any soot that may clog the burner jet is expelled.

== Reliability ==
Because the Svea 123 is made of brass and has only one moving part – the control valve (the later Svea 123R model has an additional moving part, the internal self-cleaning needle) – the Svea has a well-established record of reliability and can withstand years of heavy use with only minimal maintenance. Some users have reported operational problems with the self-cleaning needle on the 123R, such as that the stove may not simmer as well as the earlier Sievert models.

Some common but nonrecommended practices can adversely affect the Svea's performance and reliability. For example, when using a wind screen or shield other than the built-in wind screen (such as the flexible aluminum foil windscreens used with stoves made by Mountain Safety Research), care should be taken not to wrap the windscreen too tightly around the stove because this may cause the stove to overheat and the fuel tank to over-pressurize. This in turn will cause the pressure-relief valve in the filler cap to open and the over-pressurized gas vapor to escape, which may catch fire and result in a dangerous "flareup" or large fireball. In addition, while the Svea is capable of burning unleaded automobile gasoline, only naphtha or Coleman fuel is recommended: Coleman fuel contains rust inhibitors and is specially refined for use in camping stoves, while automotive fuel contains additives that vaporize when burned and leave gum-like deposits behind that causes clogging. The stove should also not be allowed to run dry because doing so will burn or char the cotton wick inside the fuel tank, which will inhibit the wick's ability to draw fuel to the vaporizing tube.

== Similar designs and copies ==
The Svea 123 shares a number of design features with several other small portable stoves.

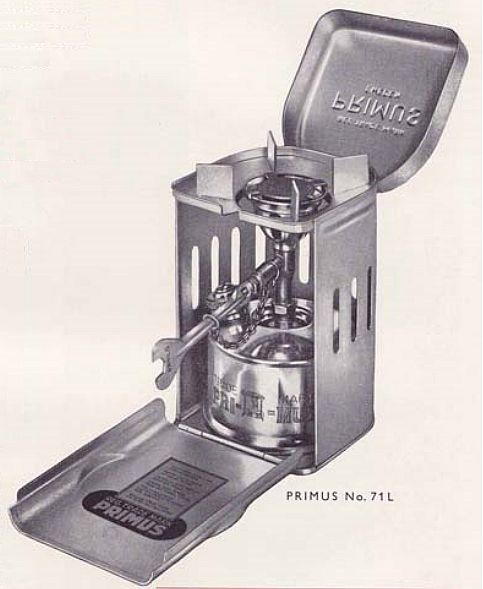
Primus 71L stove

In the 1930s, Sieverts Lödlampfabrik (maker of the original Svea 123) produced the Campus No. 3 stove. Much like the later-produced Svea, it was a self-pressurizing stove with an integrated windscreen and an aluminum lid that doubled as a cook-pot, but was slightly narrower and taller (80 mm x 150 mm) than the Svea. Because of its small size, the Campus No. 3 was advertised as a "boon to Hikers, Cyclists, and Travellers generally." Also in the 1930s, Optimus introduced the No. 6 stove, which was nearly identical to the Svea 123 in size, weight, capacity, operation and design. Optimus dropped the No. 6 in the 1940s and did not produce a similar model until its acquisition of the Svea line in 1969.

The Juwel 33 and 34 (made by Gustav Barthel of Dresden which, like Sieverts, was a maker of blowtorches and stoves) is a World War II-era German military field stove of similar size, design and operation to the Svea. The Arara 37, another German-made stove, is similar, as is the Czech-made Meva Type 2140. More recently manufactured stoves with the same design features as the Svea include the Moldavan-made Примус Туристский ПТ-2 "Огонёк" (Primus Tourist PT-2 "Little Flame"), the German-made Enders "Biwak" ("Bivouac") No. 2650, and the Juwel 84, which is essentially a larger and more recent version of the World War II-era Juwel 34. The Lion G102 stove, manufactured by the Jaeil Metal Co., Ltd. of South Korea during the 1990s, is nearly identical to the Svea, but with curved brass pot supports attached to the top of the windscreen instead of the straight metal supports used on the Svea.

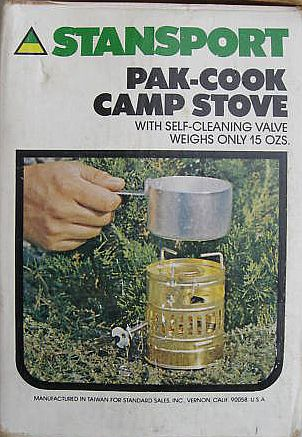
Pak-Cook stove

The Swedish-made Primus 71 and the similar Optimus 80 have a larger fuel tank and are slightly taller and heavier than the Svea. (After Optimus acquired the rights to the Primus name for liquid-fueled stoves in 1962, the Primus 71 and Optimus 80 were identical, except for the name and markings.) However, instead of the integrated windscreen on the Svea, the Primus 71 and Optimus 80 stoves fit inside a sheet-metal case for transport that when opened serves as the stove's windscreen and pot support. The type of fuel used and the method of operation of the Primus 71 is the same as the Svea. The Primus 70 is similar, but with a cylindrical aluminum container instead of a sheet-metal box. The Radius 42, another Swedish-made stove, dates from the 1920s and is slightly smaller than the Primus 71, but is otherwise the same general design.

Taiwanese-made knock-offs of the Svea 123 include the Fire-Lite and Trav-ler 77, and the Pak-Cook 235 marketed in the United States under the Stansport and Texsport names.

== See also ==
- Trangia, a Swedish alcohol stove
- Beverage-can stove
- Portable stove
