= G.I. pocket stove =

World War II–era portable liquid-fuel stove

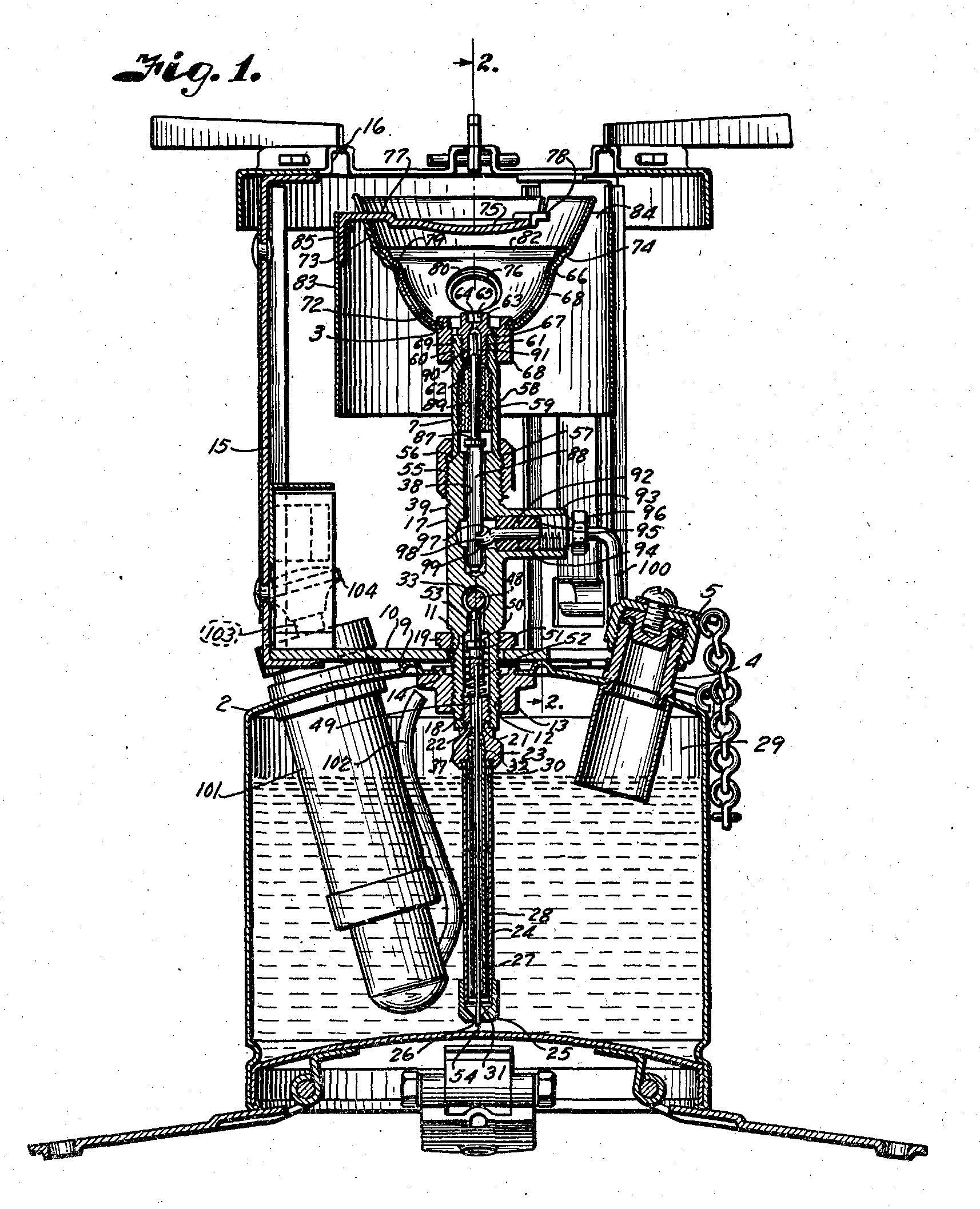
Patent drawing of Coleman Model 520 stove

The G.I. pocket stove is a World War II–era portable pressurized-burner liquid-fuel stove designed by the Coleman Company of Wichita, Kansas, and manufactured by both the Coleman Company and the American Gas Machine Company (AGM) of Albert Lea, Minnesota.

== History ==
During World War II, the U.S. government tasked Coleman to develop a compact stove for military use. The stove had to be lightweight, be no larger than a quart-sized thermos bottle, burn any kind of fuel, and operate in weather from −60 to +125 °F (−51 to 52 °C). Within 60 days, Coleman came up with what became the G.I. Pocket Stove. Designated their Model 520 Coleman Military Burner, and referred to by the Army Quartermaster Corps as the M1941 Stove, the stove first saw service in November 1942 when 5,000 of the stoves accompanied U.S. forces during the invasion of North Africa. Over 1 million of the stoves were produced for war use, where it won high praise in the field: Ernie Pyle ranked it "just behind the Jeep" in its usefulness.

== Model 520 ==
The G.I. pocket stove is 8 1/2 inches (220 mm) high and 4 1/2 inches (110 mm) in diameter, and weighs about 3 pounds (1.4 kg). It was designed to burn either leaded or unleaded automobile gasoline (sometimes referred to as "white gasoline" or pure gasoline, without lead or additives). It can hold 1 US pint (470 mL) of fuel, burn for over 3 hours on a full tank, and generate over 5,000 Btu/h (1.5 kW). Six small hinged metal pieces on the top fold outward for use as pot supports, and fold inward for storage. The stove comes with a two-piece telescoping aluminum case, which can be used as cook pots, a steel wrench that also serves as a handle for the cooking pots, a small metal disc or top plate which is placed on the burner grate to help disperse the flame, and a fuel funnel. An integrated hand-operated cleaning needle is used to remove soot or other impurities that can clog the burner tip.

G.I. pocket stove Model 520 military version has an olive-drab-painted brass fuel tank and has three small folding legs at the base, which are omitted on the Model 530, and the military version has three vertical supports for the upper frame assembly (supporting the cooking grate).

== Model 530 ==
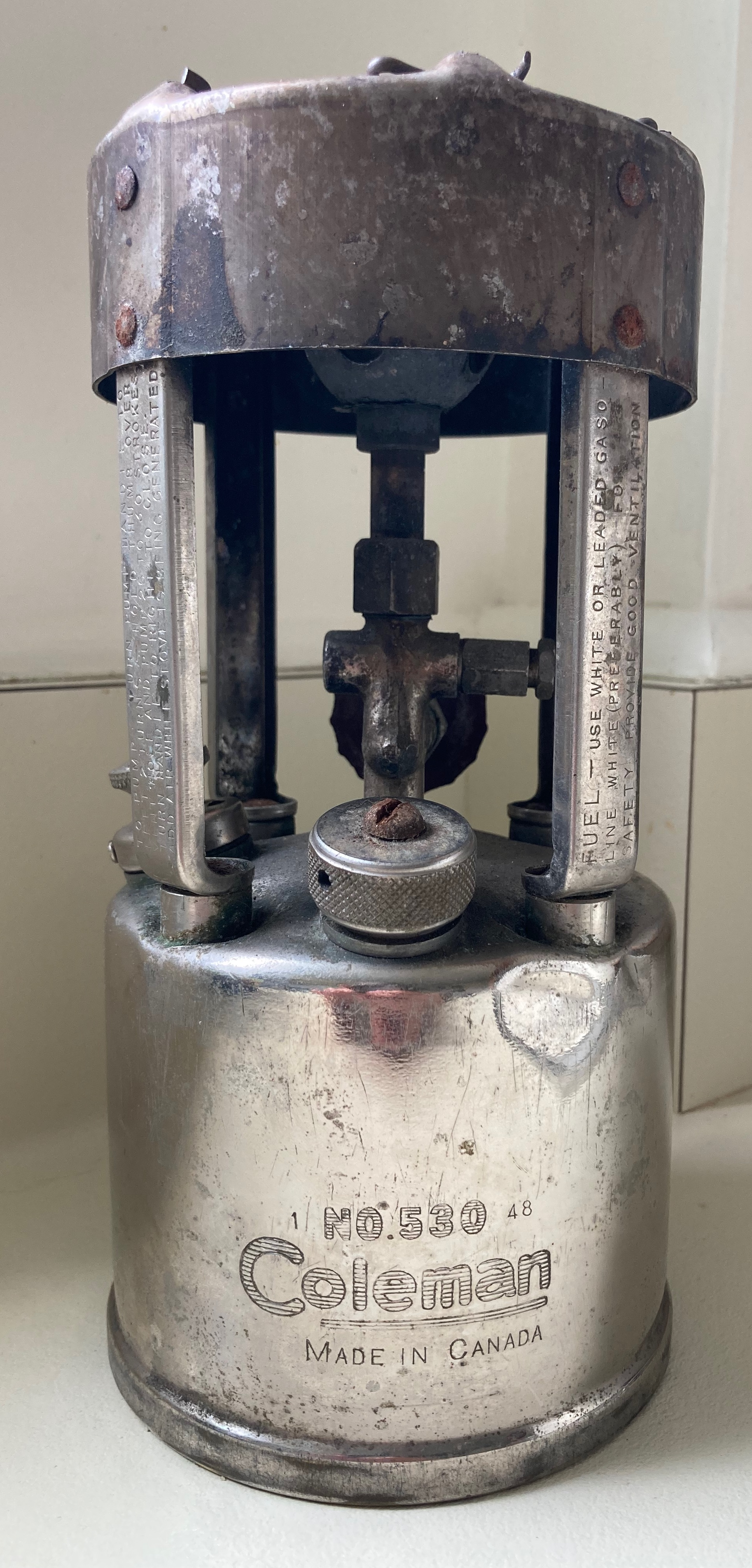
Coleman pocket stove model 530

By the end of the war, Coleman began production of a civilian version of the Model 520, designated the Model 530, and advertised as the "G.I. pocket stove". The Model 530 was promoted by Coleman as the "perfect pal for hunting, fishing and camping trips" that would "slip easily into a hunting coat pocket, glove compartment of a car, or corner of [a] picnic hamper". The single-burner G.I. Pocket Stove was manufactured only between 1946 and 1949.

The civilian version differs only slightly from its military cousin: the Model 530 G.I. pocket stove has a nickel-plated brass fuel tank. The civilian version has four vertical supports for the upper frame assembly (supporting the cooking grate).

== Operation ==
The fuel tank must first be pressurized by using the small hand-pump on the side of the stove. After pumping, the control valve is opened just slightly, allowing a mix of fuel (drawn from the bottom of the tank) and pressurized air (drawn from the top of the tank) to reach the burner head. There, the mixture is ignited using a match or lighter. Once the flame burns steadily for 2 to 3 minutes and the burner head is sufficiently heated up, the control valve is opened as far as possible. This cuts off the air from the tank, changing the mix to pure fuel. The heat of the burner head is then sufficient to vaporize the pure fuel prior to combustion. The size of the flame depends on the amount of pressure in the tank, which must be repressurized periodically using the hand pump.

== Later single-burner stoves ==
Mountain Gas Stove M-1942 (later, M-1942-MOD PW-1-45) was made by Coleman, Prentiss Wabers (a.k.a Preway) and Aladdin. The inventor of the stove was Bestor Robinson, Vice President of the San Francisco Bay Chapter of the Sierra Club, a rock climber and skier. Coleman did not manufacture another single-burner, non-military backpacking stove until 1972. Larger single-burner stoves continued in production, starting with the 500 Sportster.

== See also ==
- Portable stove
