= Portable stove =

Cooking stove specially designed to be portable and lightweight

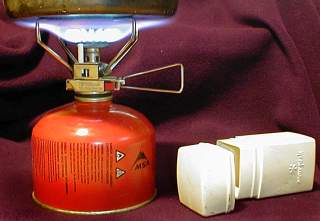
A small Snow Peak portable stove running on MSR gas and the stove's carrying case

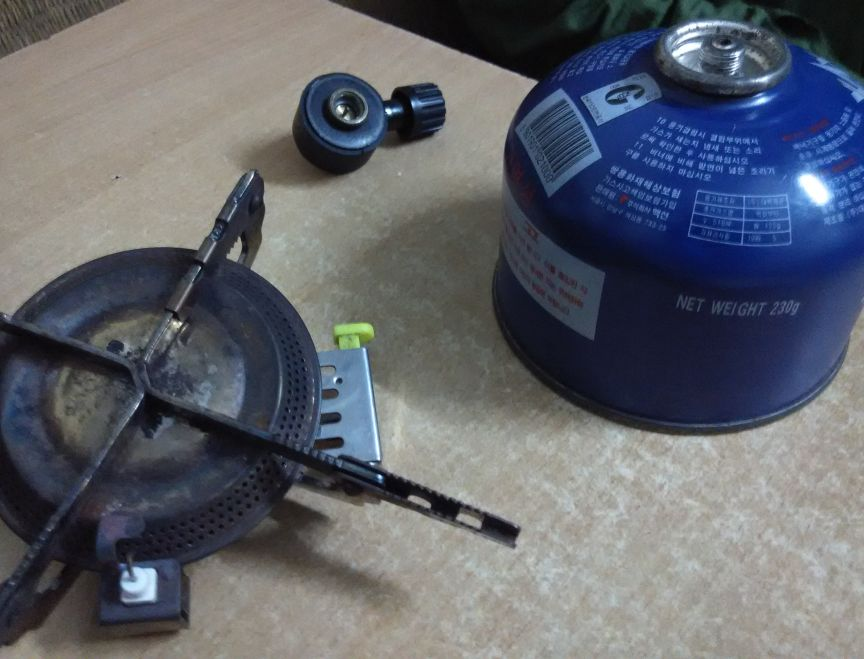
The parts of portable gas stove—gas cartridge, burner and regulator

A portable stove is a cooking stove specially designed to be portable and lightweight, used in camping, picnicking, backpacking, or other use in remote locations where an easily transportable means of cooking or heating is needed. Portable stoves can be used in diverse situations, such as for outdoor food service and catering and in field hospitals.

Since the invention of the portable stove in the 19th century, a wide variety of designs and models have seen use in a number of different applications. Portable stoves can be broken down into several broad categories based on the type of fuel used and stove design: unpressurized stoves that use solid or liquid fuel placed in the burner before ignition; stoves that use a volatile liquid fuel in a pressurized burner; bottled gas stoves; and gravity-fed "spirit" stoves.

== History ==
=== Early examples ===
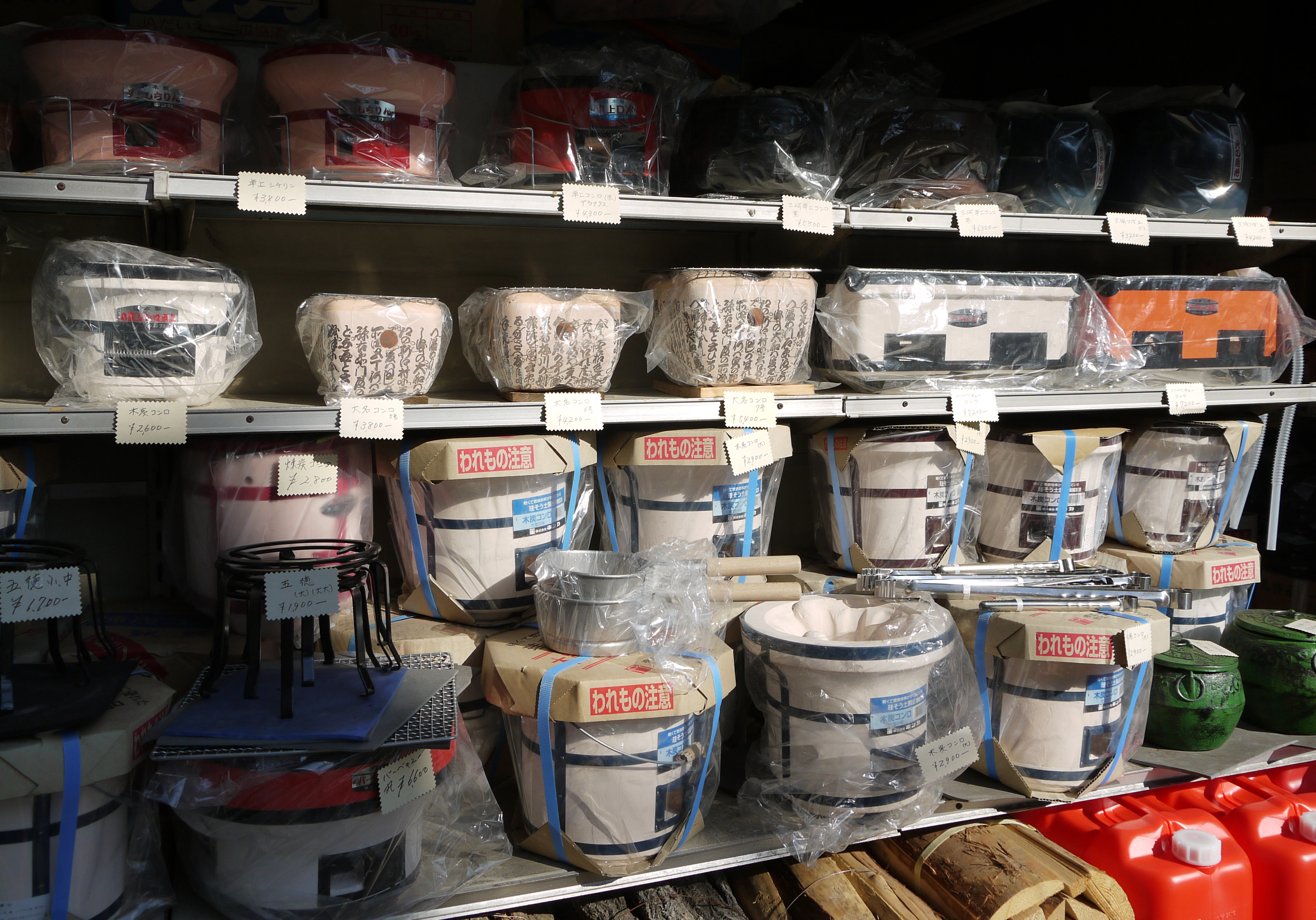
Various Japanese traditional shichirin

The shichirin, a lightweight charcoal stove, has been used in Japan in much the same form since at least the Edo period (1603-1868). Old shichirin are mainly ceramic and many can be found in old houses. Most modern Shichirin are made by heating diatomaceous earth, but the raw materials are not uniform. There are also shichirin such as those made with a double inside and outside ceramic structure. The shape is mainly cylindrical, square, or rectangular, and the size also varies. Many varieties of shichirin are made for different uses. In North America, they are also known as "hibachi" or "hibachi-style".

Early European portable stoves burned animal fat and polar explorers continued to use blubber as a supplement for cooking fuel into the early 20th Century.

=== Modern era ===
Modern portable stoves emerged from the mid-19th century. French-born chef, Alexis Soyer, became chef de cuisine at the Reform Club in London from 1837. He instituted many innovations, including cooking with gas, refrigerators cooled by cold water, and ovens with adjustable temperatures. In 1849 Soyer began to market his portable "magic stove" which allowed people to cook food wherever they were. The design of Soyer's "Magic Stove" was based on the same principle as a kerosene lamp, in which a wick is used to draw fuel from a tank or reservoir to a burner.

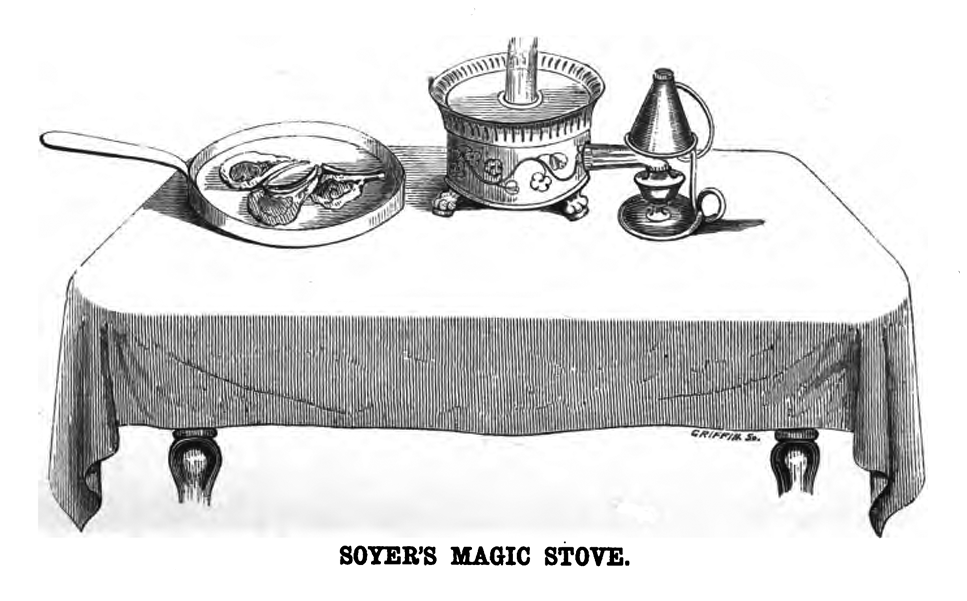
Alexis Soyer's "Magic Stove", used by British troops during the Crimean War

During the Crimean War, Soyer joined the troops at his own expense to advise the army on cooking. Later he was paid his expenses and wages equivalent to those of a Brigadier-General. He designed his own field stove, the Soyer Stove, and trained and installed in every regiment the "Regimental cook" so that soldiers would get an adequate meal and not suffer from malnutrition or die of food poisoning. Catering standards within the British Army would remain inconsistent, however, and there would not be a single Army Catering Corps until 1945. This is now part of the Royal Logistic Corps, whose catering HQ is called Soyer's House. His stove, or adaptions of it, remained in British military service into the late 20th century.

In the 1850s, the famous Alpine mountaineer Francis Fox Tuckett developed an alcohol stove for campers and mountaineers known as the "Russian furnace". It was also known as the "Rob Roy", after John MacGregor, the renowned canoeist who was nicknamed "Rob Roy". MacGregor's 1866 book, "A Thousand Miles in the Rob Roy Canoe" was an international success and described his camping methods. Tuckett's stove and integral cook kit was designed to hang from a cord in the interior of a tent.

Fridtjof Nansen also developed an alcohol stove in the 1880s based on the work of Adolphus Greely. This improved on early designs and later became the basis for the Trangia cooker.

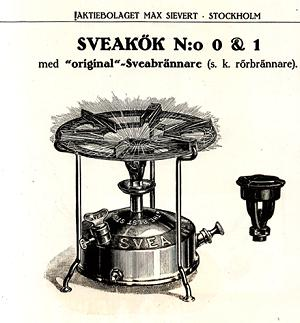
Early portable kerosene stove

Carl Richard Nyberg invented the blowtorch in 1882 and began manufacturing Primus stoves a decade later. The first model, called Viktoria, was not very successful, but the later Svea did better. Other sources credit Frans W Lindqvist for the same thing at the same time.

The use of single burner alcohol stoves for camping, similar to the contemporary Trangia brand, was reported as early as 1919. For many years alcohol-based stoves were used on sailboats rather than stoves using kerosene for safety reasons; these have since been largely replaced by stoves using compressed gas (such as liquefied petroleum gas, butane or propane) in disposable or refillable canisters. Stoves designed for military use, such as the World War II-era G.I. Pocket Stove, were designed to run on gasoline. So-called "white gas" or naphtha is commonly used as a fuel for camping and backpacking stoves, such as the compact Svea 123. Newer camping stoves are capable of burning multiple types of fuel, which makes them well suited for international travel where some particular types of fuel may not be readily available.

The use of lightweight portable stoves for camping became commonplace in Britain and Europe in the latter half of the 19th Century. The practice gained acceptance later in North America, and coincided with increased awareness of the environmental impact that campers and backpackers had on the areas where they travelled.

Prior to their use, the usual practice when backpacking was to build an open fire for cooking from available materials such as fallen branches. The fire scar left on the ground would remain for two or three years before the vegetation recovered. The accumulation of fire scars in heavily travelled areas detracted from the pristine appearance that backpackers expected, leading to more widespread use of portable stoves.

== Uses ==
Stoves differ widely in their size and portability. The smallest models are generally termed backpacking stoves. They are designed for use in backpacking and bicycle touring, where light weight and small size are paramount considerations. Backpacking stoves consist only of the burner, fuel tank and pot supports. The legs – if any – are often collapsible to minimize the space required. The weight may range from about 1 to 2 ounces (30 to 60 g) for simple alcohol stoves, 11 to 14 ounces (310 to 400 g) for MSR-type stoves (without fuel weight) and canister stoves (with gas cartridge), and up to 1 pound (0.45 kg) for larger stoves. Single burner alcohol stoves, beverage can stoves, and small liquid fuel and gas canister stoves are well suited for backpacking.

Camping stoves are designed for use by people travelling by car, boat, canoe, or on horseback. They are similar in function and ease of use to kitchen stovetops, usually with two burners set into a table-like surface, and often with a folding lid for stowage and wind protection. This increases the weight accordingly.

== Unpressurized liquid-fuel stoves ==
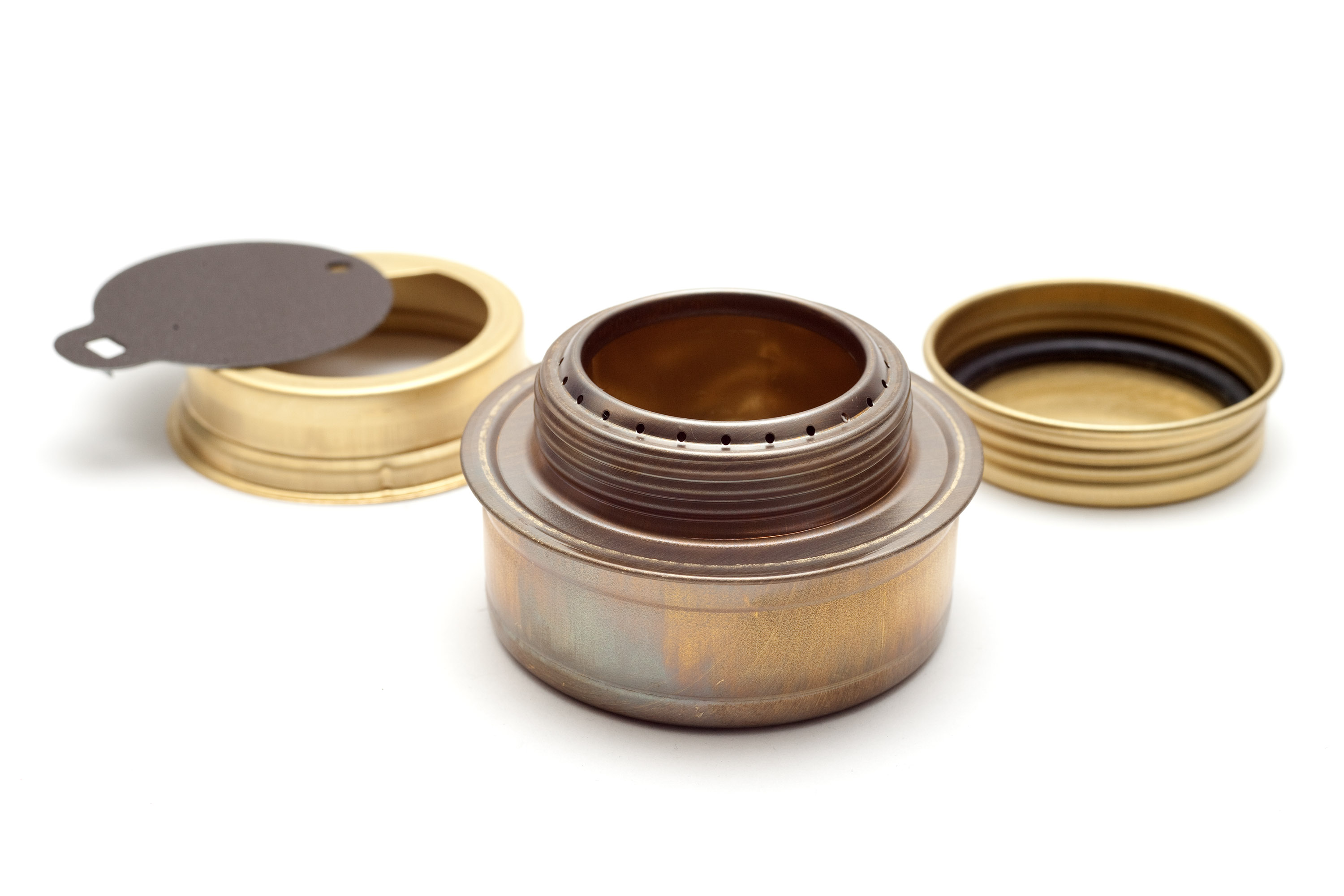
Trangia single-burner alcohol stove with cap and lid

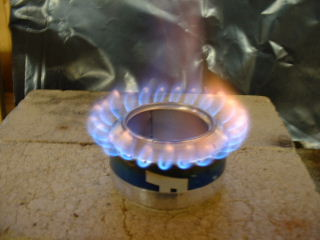
A homemade soda can stove

=== Single burner alcohol stoves ===
The simplest type of stove is an unpressurized single burner design, in which the burner contains the fuel and which once lit burns until it is either extinguished or the fuel is exhausted. There are both liquid- and solid-fuel stoves of this variety. Because they are extremely small and lightweight, this type of stove tends to be favored by ultralight backpackers as well as those seeking to minimize weight and bulk, particularly for extended backpacking trips. Solid-fuel stoves are also commonly used in emergency kits, both because they are compact and the fuel is very stable over time. These simple stoves are also commonly used when serving fondue.

The Trangia stove is a popular commercial alcohol stove, which is available in many different models, from a single bare burner to an integrated expedition cooking system. Some of these come with a sealing cover, allowing the burner to be packed while still containing fuel, although putting the lid on while the stove is hot can damage the O ring seal (hence it may leak in transit). An even simpler system is the Sterno heater, in which the can that contains a jellied fuel also serves as the burner. Homemade beverage can stoves (or "Pepsi/beer/etc. can stoves") are similar. These are made from discarded aluminium beverage cans, and come in a wide variety of different designs.

=== Gravity-fed spirit stoves ===
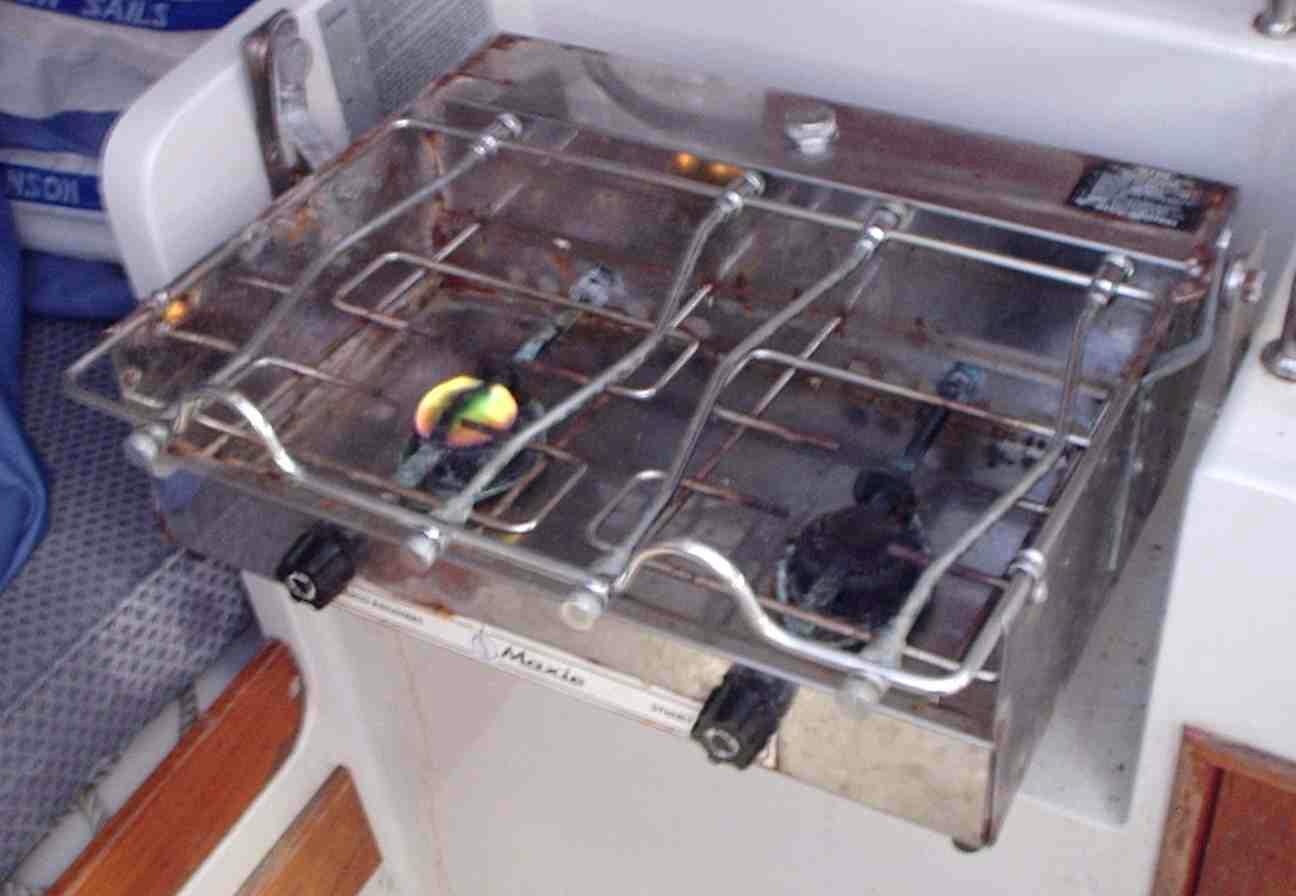
Two-burner spirit stove, with far burner on low heat

The traditional "spirit stove" (alcohol or methylated spirits) consists of a small reservoir or fuel tank raised above and to the side of the burner. The fuel tank supplies the methylated spirits under gravity to the burner, where it is vaporized and burned. The gravity-fed spirit stove is still found in many pleasure boats, although it has largely been replaced by compressed gas stoves.

Lighting a gravity-fed spirit stove is similar to lighting a traditional Primus stove. Around each burner is a priming pan used to preheat the burner. To light the stove, the burner is first turned on to allow a small amount of fuel to pass through the burner and collect as a liquid in the priming pan. The burner is then turned off, and the fuel ignited to preheat the burner. When the fuel in the pan is almost all gone, the burner is turned on again, and fuel passes into the burner where it is vaporized and passes through the jets.

These stoves look and even sound a bit like pressurized burner stoves, but the fuel tank is under no pressure. They remain popular for small boats owing to the minimal fire risk they pose in a confined space.

=== Wicking stoves ===
Wicking stoves are typically fueled by alcohol or kerosene.

- ORIGO alcohol stove
- Project Gaia§The CleanCook Stove
- Butterfly 16-Wick Kerosene Cook Stove

==== Platinum catalysis stove ====
Humphry Davy discovered the use of platinum in catalysis, in which a catalytic body is interposed in the path of a combustible vapor and is heated upon its passage through the catalytic body sufficiently to unite with the air upon egress and then burn on the surface. These stoves are typically described as wind-resistant, infrared, or radiant.

- Rechauds Catalytiques (1920, wicking)
- Therm'x Explorer 57C (1965, wicking)
- MSR Reactor (2007, pressurized)
- Rechaud A Catalytise Trek 270 (2010, pressurized)

== Pressurized liquid fuel stoves ==
=== Primus stoves ===
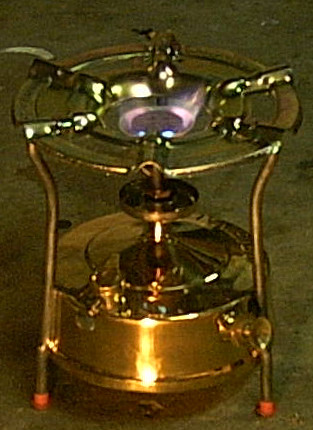
Primus kerosene pressure stove

The introduction of the first pressurized burner portable stove is generally credited to Frans Wilhelm Lindqvist, in 1892. Lindqvist's stove was based on the pressurized blowtorch but fitted with an upturned burner assembly of his own design. Together with partner J.V. Svensson, Lindqvist established the Primus brand of stove, which quickly developed into a worldwide market leader.

The kerosene burning Primus stoves and their imitators were made of brass and were a significant advance over previous designs, which had used a wick to supply liquid fuel to the burner by capillary action. The Primus burner vaporized the fuel in a loop of pipe which rose up from the fuel tank at the stove's base, and which was pre-heated with alcohol (or "methylated spirits") before being combusted in the burner. Initial pressure is provided by a small, hand-operated pump integrated into the stove's fuel tank. The flame on a Primus stove is adjusted by using the pump to increase the pressure in the tank to make the flame larger, or by venting the tank to reduce the pressure and make the flame smaller. Later models used a separate valve to adjust the flame. Primus-style stoves were made in a variety of sizes and styles, and many were designed to be disassembled for storage and transportation in a separate case.

=== Compact camping and hiking stoves ===
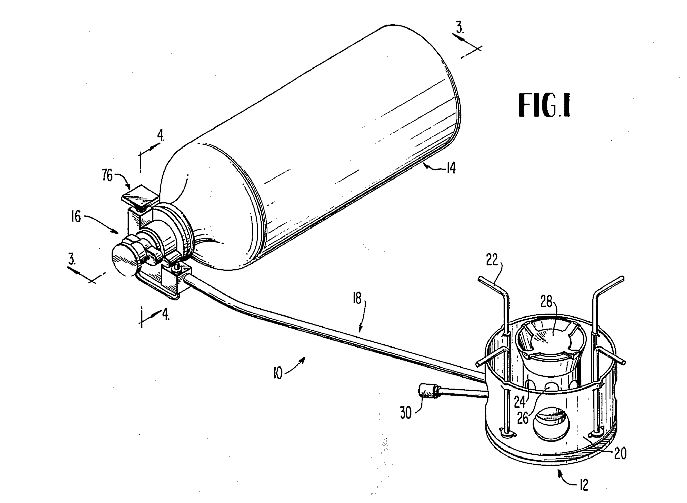
Patent drawing of MSR XGK stove

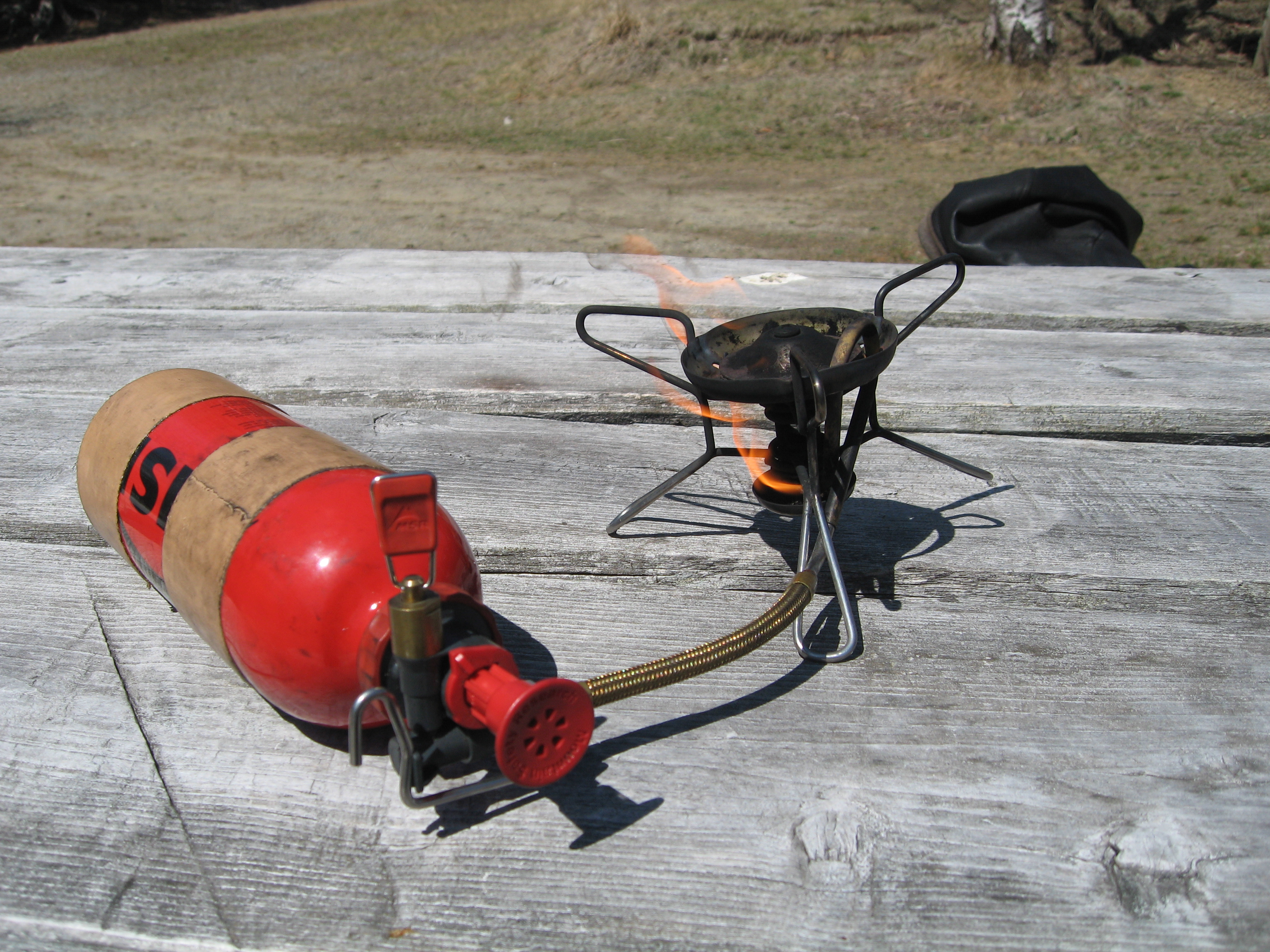
Pre-heating MSR Whisperlite International stove (first generation)

Smaller, more compact stoves were developed in the early 20th century that used petrol (gasoline), which at that time was similar to so-called white gas and did not have the additives and other constituents contained in modern gasoline. Similar in design to the kerosene-burning Primus-style stove, the smaller white gas stove was also made of brass with the fuel tank at the base and the burner assembly at the top. Unlike the Primus-style stove, however, priming both pressurizes the tank and pre-heats the burner assembly in this type of stove. Once lit, the heat from the burner maintains the pressure in the tank until the flame is extinguished. The Svea 123, introduced in 1955, is among the most popular of these "self pressurizing" stove designs, and is generally considered to be the first compact camping stove. Optimus of Sweden manufactures a line of similarly designed stoves in which the stove's components are entirely enclosed in a folding metal case, the most popular of which were the Optimus 8R and 111 (still in production as the Optimus Hiker). The Coleman Company developed a small white gas stove with integral fuel tank for the US Army in World War II, the "GI pocket stove". Coleman still makes similar stoves, such as the 442, 533 and 550B (the latter of which can also run on kerosene). These stoves have a pump to build up initial pressure in the fuel tank, but are generally self-pressurising when running (occasional re-pumping may be necessary if the stove is run at full output).

In the early 1970s Mountain Safety Research (MSR) designed a pressurized burner stove intended to address performance shortcomings of white gas stoves in cold or adverse conditions, in particular for mountaineering use. First introduced in 1973 and designated the Model 9 (and later as the XGK Expedition), the MSR stove had four main parts: a free-standing burner assembly with integrated pot supports; the fuel bottle, which doubles as the stove's fuel tank; a pump that screws into the bottle; and a flexible tube or pipeline connecting the pump/bottle assembly to the burner assembly. This type of stove design, with the "outboard" fuel tank held away from the burner, is primed in the same manner as other white gas stoves; however, because the tank is not self-pressurizing, the tank must periodically be pumped to maintain pressure to the burner. Most commercial liquid fuel camping stoves on the market today are of this design.

Pressurized burner stoves are now available that can burn several different fuels or volatile liquids, including alcohol, gasoline or other motor fuels, kerosene, and jet propellant. Little or no modification is needed; due to variability of the volatility of different fuels, the jets of multi-fuel stoves may need to be changed for the different fuels, and many others.

=== Coiled burner stoves ===
The "coiled burner" stove is a variant on the pressurized burner design, in which the burner assembly consists of a coiled loop with a small hole in the lower part, through which the vaporized fuel exits and combusts. Generally small, lightweight and cheaply made, these were sold under the brand name "Stesco", "Tay-Kit", "Handy Camper" and others. A more substantial version of the coiled burner stove is the Swiss-made Josef Borde stove.

=== Gas cartridge stoves ===
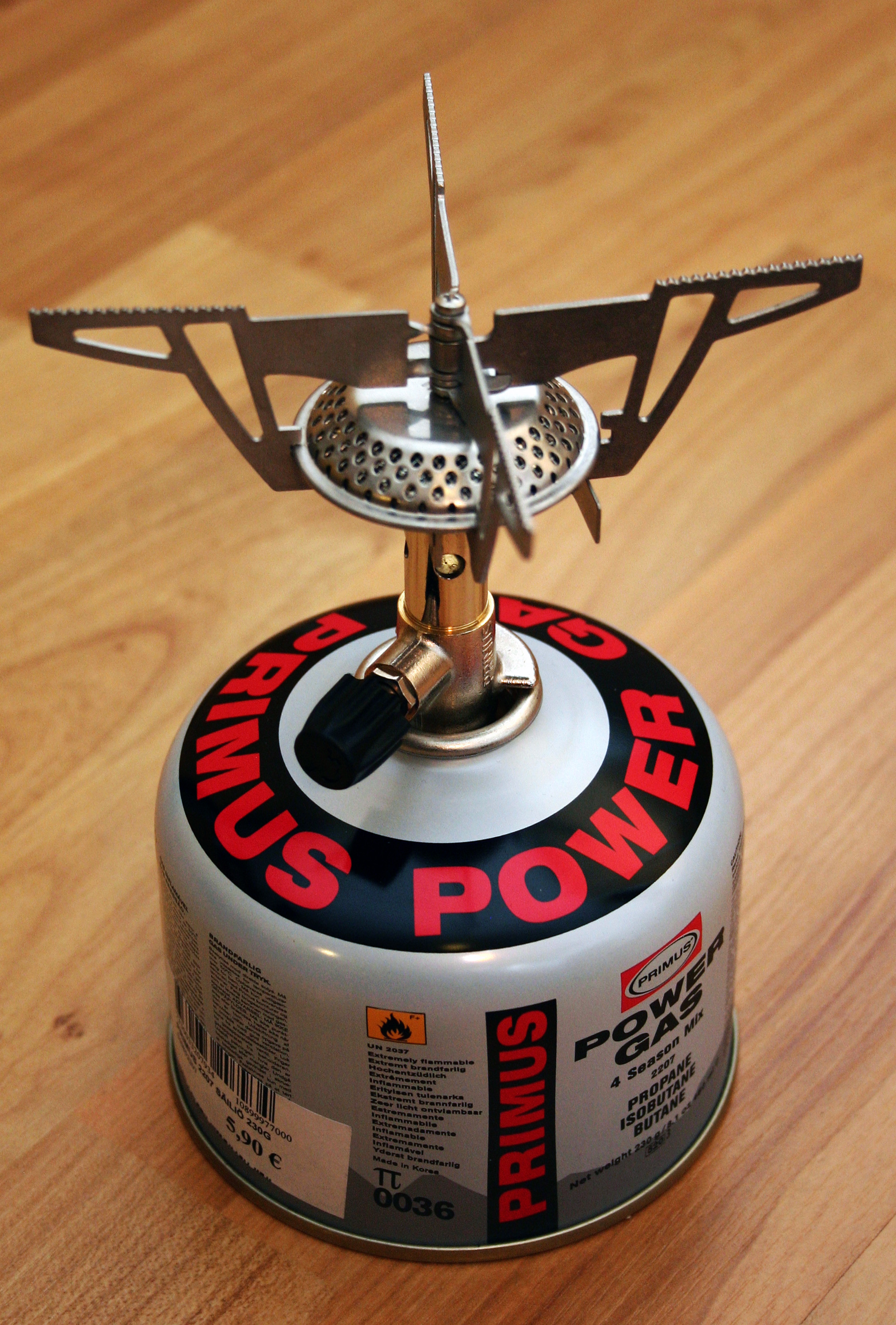
A gas cartridge camping stove

The design of most portable gas cartridge stoves is similar to that of many pressurized burner stoves, except the fuel tank or cartridge contains a liquefied gas – typically butane, propane or a mixture of hydrocarbons – that is held under pressure. While the gas in the cartridge is in a liquid state when stored under pressure, it vaporizes immediately as it leaves the storage bottle (i.e., without priming), arriving at the burner as a gas. The principal advantage of gas cartridge stoves is convenience: no priming is required, they are generally maintenance-free and capable of immediate high heat output, the flame is easily adjusted and they are generally considered simpler to operate. There are two basic designs for most gas cartridge stoves used for camping: the burner assembly is fitted into the top of the gas cartridge, which serves as the stove's base, or the stove is free-standing and the cartridge is separated from the burner and connected by means of a small hose or pipe. Single burner propane stoves commonly used in food service have the gas container integrated into the body of the stove. Butane cartridges are almost exclusively manufactured in South Korea with the only exception being one manufacturer in Houston, Texas. Butane canisters manufactured in South Korea contain butane from Saudi Arabia, while the American manufacturer fills canisters with domestic butane.

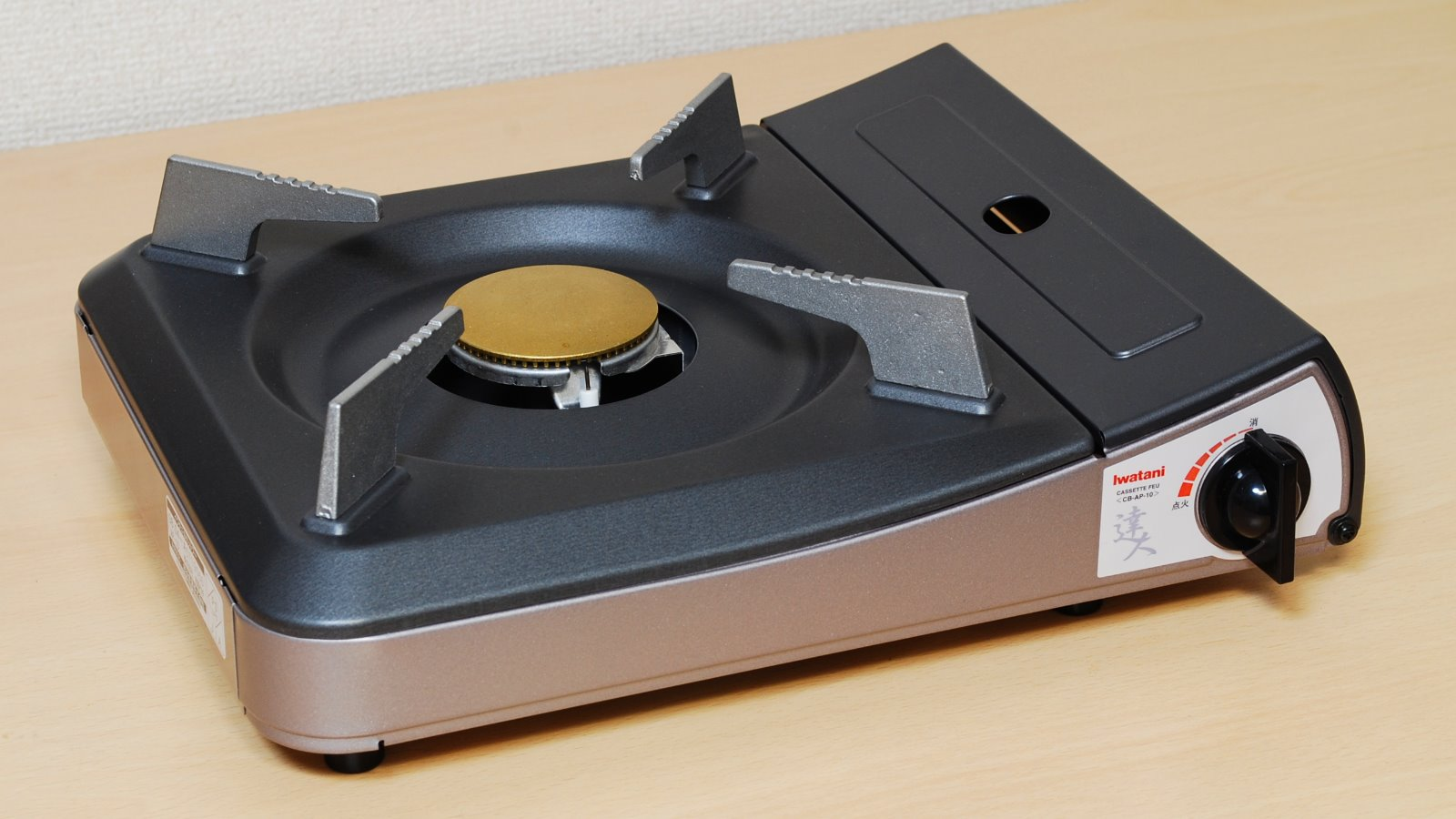
Gas cartridge stove

Gas cartridges for camping stoves tend to be costly and usually are not refillable. Single-use cartridges are considered objectionable by some on environmental grounds. They perform poorly in cold weather. Until the approval of EN 417-specification Lindal valve cartridges of 1992 there was little compatibility between different makers and systems, and cartridges for older cartridge stoves were often unobtainable. Outside of camping, single-burner stoves using cans of compressed butane gas are used for catering and other food service applications.

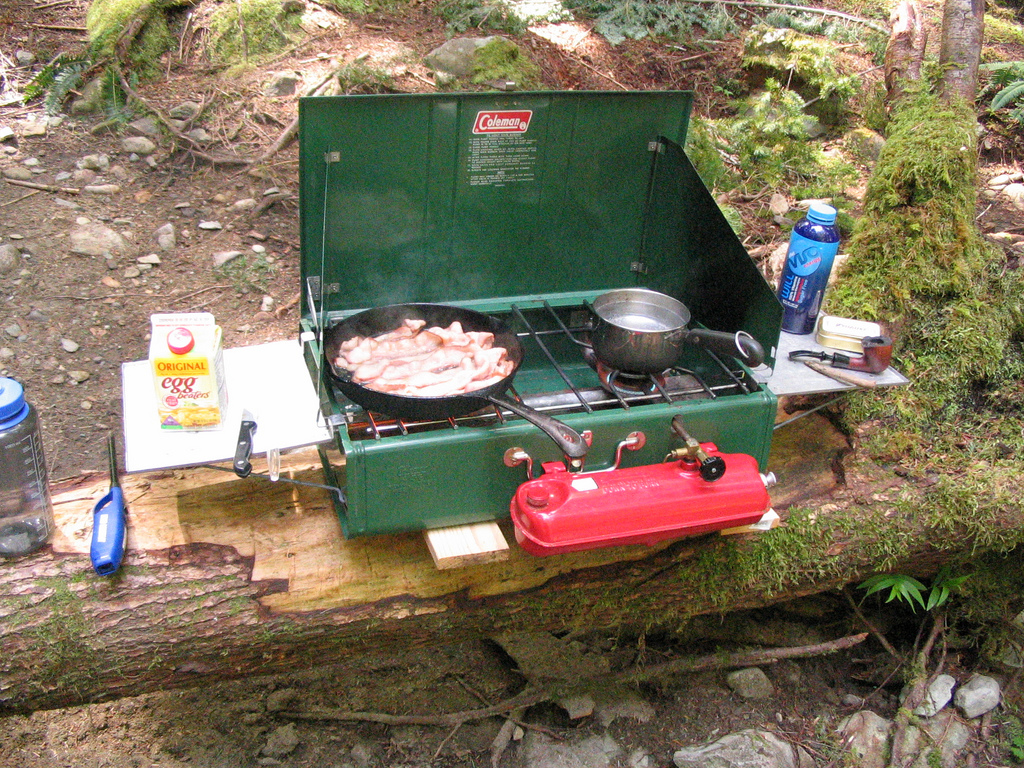
Coleman white gas camp stove

Refillable gas bottles are heavier, and tend to be used on larger stoves intended for car camping, expedition base camps, and residential use (as for barbecues).

=== Multiple burner stoves ===
Stoves with two or more burners that may be operated together or separately are common for use in base camp, car camping and other situations involving cooking for larger groups. The folding "suitcase" style by Coleman is the best known of this design, and is intended to be used on a flat, stable surface such as a tabletop. This type of stove may have a separate fuel tank for each burner, or more commonly a single tank shared by both burners. Multiple burner stoves generally use compressed gas, alcohol or Naphtha (also known as White gas or Coleman fuel).

== Solid-fuel stoves ==
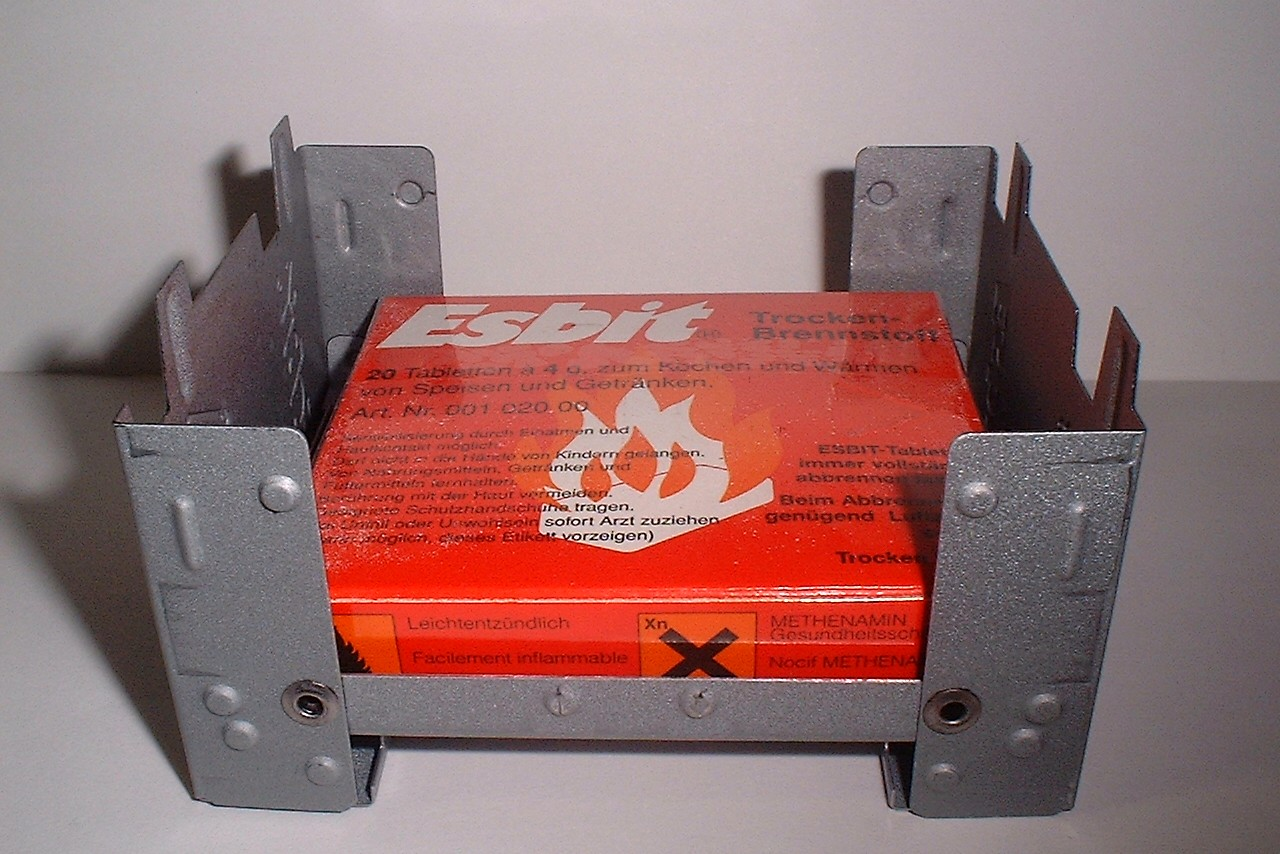
Esbit stove with box of fuel tablets

A solid-fuel stove may consist of no more than a metal base plate and container to hold the fuel, a set of legs to keep this assembly out of contact with the ground, and some supports for a billycan or other cooking vessel. This design is scalable, and may be used for anything from tiny backpacking stoves to large portable woodstoves. Fuel may be manufactured, e.g., hexamine, or natural, e.g., woody forest debris.

=== Manufactured fuel ===
Among compact commercial models, the Esbit hexamine stove burns small tablets of hexamine or trioxane in a folding stand made of aluminium or other base metal, and is a German design that dates from World War II. Generally intended for use by a single person, the fumes will tend to taint food if exposed to the burning tablets, and will also leave a messy residue that may be difficult to remove from cookware.

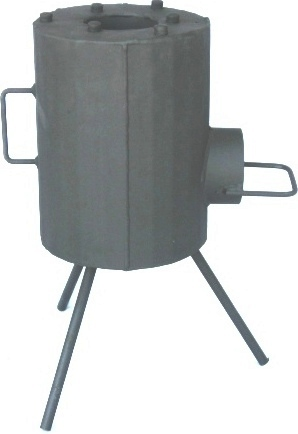
A rocket stove

Outside of America, metaldehyde is used as a solid fuel in small portable stoves. It is a lightweight fuel with little smell that burns leaving no residue. It is however toxic to animals including humans if ingested and metaldehyde fuel tablets need to be handled with care to avoid inadvertent ingestion.

=== Natural fuel, forest wood debris ===
Stoves that use natural solid fuel, e.g., wood and other forest debris, have an obvious advantage: the user need not carry any stove fuel on his or her back. This native fuel typically consists of twigs and small pine cones the user gathers at their campsite and places in the fuel chamber of their stove. This substitution of natural fuel for artificial fuel can amount to a savings of several ounces or pounds of fuel and their containers not carried in a traveler's pack, depending on length of trip. Issues of plumbing connections, fuel toxicity, leakage, spillage, and stove flareup are also nonexistent when using a solid-fuel portable stove. Contribution to climate change and dependence on fossil fuel is also minimized when using a portable stove powered by a local, renewable biomass resource (however, carbon dioxide is released no matter what source of fuel you use).

While simple, solid-fuel stoves have some disadvantages versus their liquid-fueled counterparts. In most cases, the burn rate may be controlled only by varying the amount of fuel placed on the fire, while fluid fuels may be controlled precisely with valves. In addition, no solid fuel burns completely. Solid-fuel stoves produce a small amount of ash, and they can coat the bottoms of cooking vessels with tars and soot. In addition, because some of the chemical energy of the fuel remains locked up in the smoke and soot, solid fuel releases less heat, gram for gram.

A simple hobo stove is constructed out of a discarded tin can of any size by removing the top of the can, punching a number of holes near the upper edge, and punching corresponding holes in the opposite base. Wood or other fuel is placed in the can and ignited. A pot (or larger tin can) is placed on the top of the can for cooking. Stoves of similar design can be made out of materials other than cans, such as discarded duct pipe. More complex stoves may use a double-walled design with a chamber for partial biomass gasification and additional mixing to increase heat output and provide a cleaner, more complete burn.

Another type of a solid fuel stove which has been becoming more common is what is called the rocket stove. It is found more commonly in lesser-developed countries where wood fuel sources are more scarce. There are several different designs that are used but smaller ones are portable and are made of steel and other materials with insulation inside a double-walled design with a chamber for partial biomass gasification and additional mixing of air and wood gas to increase heat output and provide a cleaner, more-complete burn. The advantage of these rocket stoves is their requiring little fuel, such as wood and dry weeds, to cook a meal, and with this less air pollution.

The single AA battery operated, fan-driven Sierra "Zip" stove burns small twigs, pinecones, bark, or other small flammable items. The fuel is placed into a small chamber and, with the fan turned on, burns at a high heat output of 15,000 BTUs/hr (4.40 kW), about twice that of typical gasoline stoves. Because the wood burns quickly in a Zip stove, it needs to be constantly refueled during cooking. However, because of its ability to take advantage of whatever small bits of wood that can be scrounged from the forest floor, the additional weight and bulk of packing additional fuel supplies is avoided. Ed Garvey, the noted Appalachian Trail benefactor and multiple A.T. thru-hiker, carried a Zip stove with him when he hiked the A.T. at the age of 75.

== Fuel comparison ==
Advantages and disadvantages of various fuels for portable stoves
| Fuel type | Flash point | Advantages | Disadvantages |
|---|---|---|---|
| Propane | −104 °C/−155 °F | Readily available Larger containers refillable Better than butane in cold weather Boiling point: −42.2 °C/−44.1 °F | High cost Canister disposal required Most airlines forbid transporting fuel by air Canisters are heavier than containers for other fuels |
| Butane | −60 °C/−76 °F | Instant high heat output No priming required | High cost Canister disposal required Most airlines forbid transporting fuel by air Lower heat output than white gas Fuel not always readily available Potentially explosive Poor performance in cold weather Boiling point: −1 °C/30 °F |
| Unleaded automobile fuel | −49.0 °C/−56.2 °F (Pentane) <~∞~> 13.0 °C/55.4 °F (Octane) | Inexpensive; High heat output Readily available worldwide Spilled fuel evaporates quickly | Priming required May produce sooty smoke Spilled fuel highly flammable Fuel additives clog the stove, however the fuel can be purified via distillation with a Pot still |
| Petroleum spirits (known as benzine, benzoline, gasoline, naphtha, white spirit) or White gas or Shellite. | −45 °C/−49 °F (White gas) <~∞~> 31 °C/87.8 °F (White spirit) | High heat output Spilled fuel evaporates quickly | May produce sooty smoke Spilled fuel highly flammable Priming sometimes required, depending on the type of stove |
| Kerosene | 46.0 °C/114.8 °F (Decane) <~∞~> 83 °C/181 °F (Dodecane) | Inexpensive; High heat output | Priming required May produce sooty smoke Spilled fuel evaporates very slowly |
| Alcohol | 16 °C/61 °F (Ethanol) | Quiet; Clean burning Readily available | Lower heat output Longer cooking time Must be pre-heated in cold weather (not required for jellied alcohol ("Sterno")); Fuel may contain toxic additives |
| Chafing fuel (methanol, ethanol, or diethylene glycol) | | Lightweight and burn time per gram of fuel weight is very high. Clean burning, quiet, safe indoors, and readily available. | Much lower heat output when compared to white gas and kerosene. Lower heat output when compared to Alcohol, dependent on how much water is mixed in to make it burn cooler so as not to burn/boil the food in a Chafing dish. |
| Wood (forest debris) | | No carried fuel (weight); Free; Readily available worldwide No toxic, spill, leakage issues | May produce sooty smoke May require skill or additives to ignite when moist Environmental concerns about removing dead wood from forests |

== See also ==
- Beverage-can stove
- BioLite
- Buddy Burner
- Dutch oven
- EcoZoom
- Hibachi
- History of the portable gas stove
- Hobo stove
- Hot plate
- Kelly Kettle
- List of stoves
- Outdoor cooking
- Rocket stove
- Solar cooker
