= White spirit =

Petroleum-derived clear, transparent liquid

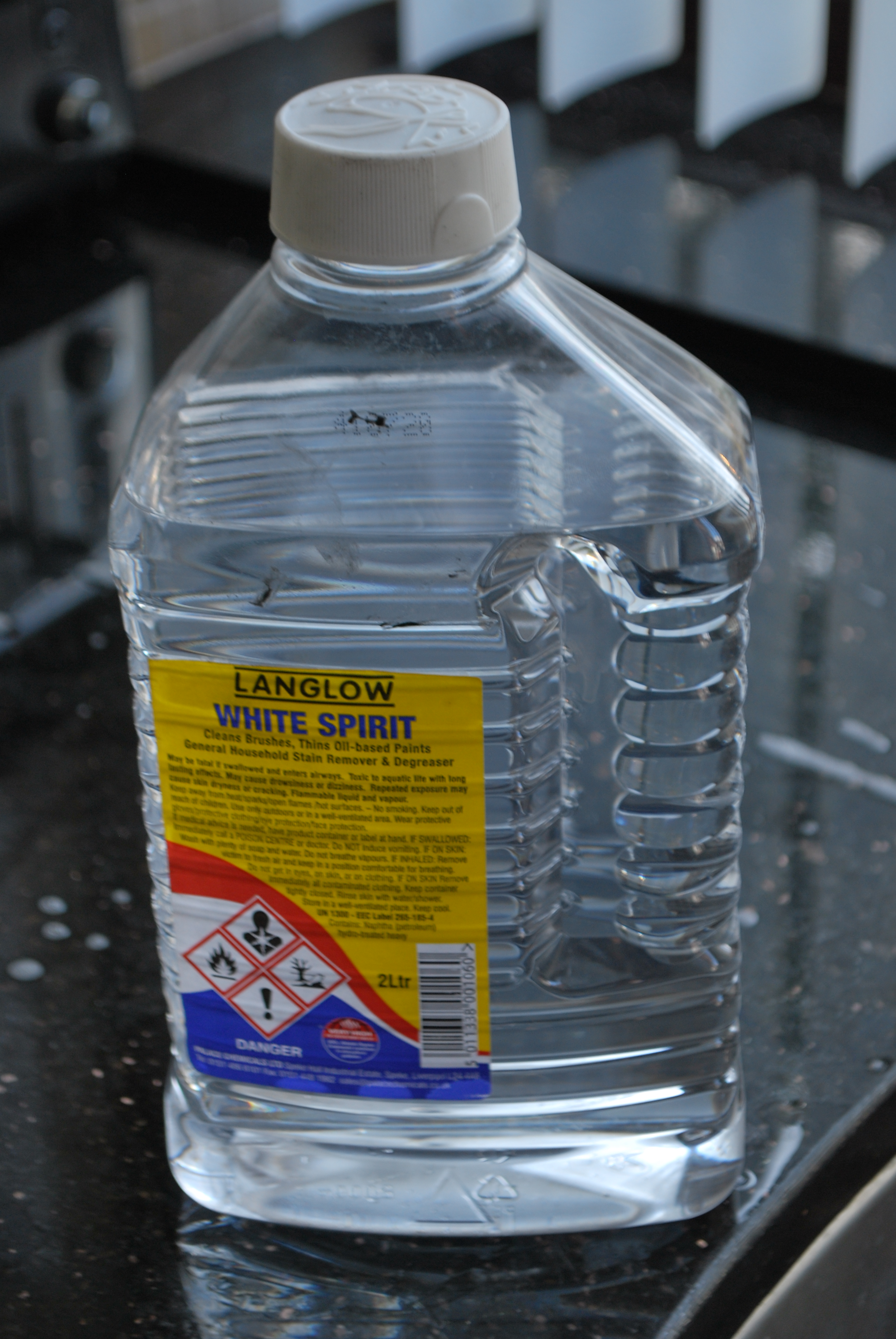
A 2-litre (3.5 imp pt) container of white spirit

White spirit (AU, UK and Ireland) (Note: Primarily in the United Kingdom and Australia. In New Zealand "white spirit" can also refer to Coleman fuel (white gas).) or mineral spirits (US, Canada), also known as mineral turpentine (AU/NZ/ZA), turpentine substitute, and petroleum spirits, is a petroleum-derived clear liquid used as a common organic solvent in painting. There are also terms for specific kinds of white spirit, including Stoddard solvent and solvent naphtha (petroleum). White spirit is often used as a paint thinner, or as a component thereof, though paint thinner is a broader category of solvent. Odorless mineral spirits (OMS) have been refined to remove the more toxic aromatic compounds, and are recommended for applications such as oil painting.

A mixture of aliphatic, open-chain or alicyclic C_{7} to C_{12} hydrocarbons, white spirit is insoluble in water and is used as an extraction solvent, as a cleaning solvent, as a degreasing solvent and as a solvent in aerosols, paints, wood preservatives, lacquers, varnishes, and asphalt products. In western Europe about 60% of the total white spirit consumption is used in paints, lacquers and varnishes. White spirit is the most widely used solvent in the paint industry. In households, white spirit is commonly used to clean paint brushes after use, to clean auto parts and tools, as a starting fluid for charcoal grills, to remove adhesive residue from non-porous surfaces, and many other common tasks.

The word "mineral" in "mineral spirits" or "mineral turpentine" is meant to distinguish it from distilled spirits (alcoholic beverages distilled from fermented biological material) or from true turpentine (distilled tree resin, composed mostly of pinene). This substance is not edible, despite the name "spirits" potentially drawing confusion with liquor, and consumption would result in acute and chronic adverse effects on human health.

== Types and grades ==
Three different types and three different grades of white spirit exist. The type refers to whether the solvent has been subjected to hydrodesulfurization (removal of sulfur) alone (type 1), solvent extraction (type 2) or hydrogenation (type 3).

Each type comprises three grades: low flash grade, regular grade, and high flash grade (flash refers to flash point). The grade is determined by the crude oil used as the starting material and the conditions of distillation.

In addition there is type 0, which is defined as distillation fraction with no further treatment, consisting predominantly of saturated C_{9} to C_{12} hydrocarbons with a boiling range of 140–200 °C (284–392 °F).

Stoddard solvent is a specific mixture of hydrocarbons, typically over 65% C_{10} or higher hydrocarbons, developed in 1924 by Atlanta dry cleaner W. J. Stoddard and Lloyd E. Jackson of the Mellon Institute of Industrial Research as a less flammable petroleum-based dry cleaning solvent than the petroleum solvents then in use. Dry cleaners began using the result of their work in 1928 and it soon became the predominant dry cleaning solvent in the United States, until the late 1950s.

Turpentine substitute is generally not made to a standard and can have a wider range of components than products marketed as white spirit, which is made to a standard (in the UK, British Standard BS 245, in Germany, DIN 51632). Turpentine substitute can be used for general cleaning but is not recommended for paint thinning as it may adversely affect drying times due to the less volatile components; while it may be used for brush cleaning its heavier components may leave an oily residue.

== Chemical registry numbers ==
CAS	EINECS	Name	Descriptive name	Ref
8030-30-6	232-443-2	Naphtha		
8052-41-3	232-489-3	Stoddard solvent	Stoddard solvent is a North American term corresponding to white spirit type 1	
64742-88-7	265-191-7	white spirit type 0	medium aliphatic solvent naphtha (petroleum)	
64742-82-1	265-185-4	white spirit type 1	hydrodesulphurized heavy naphtha (petroleum)	
64741-92-0	265-095-5	white spirit type 2	solvent-refined heavy naphtha (petroleum)	
64742-48-9	265-150-3	white spirit type 3	hydrotreated heavy naphtha (petroleum)	

== Physical properties ==
Type 1 white spirit is mainly used in most of Europe and Stoddard solvent is used in the US, both of which correspond to each other.

Physical properties of white spirit
Property	Low flash grade	Regular flash grade	High flash grade
Initial boiling point (IBP)	130–144 °C (266–291 °F)	145–174 °C (293–345 °F)	175–200 °C (347–392 °F)
Final boiling point	IBP+21 °C (70 °F), max. 220 °C (428 °F)		
Average relative molecular mass	140	150	160
Relative density 15 °C (59 °F)	0.765	0.780	0.795
Flash point	21–30 °C (70–86 °F)	31–54 °C (88–129 °F)	> 55 °C (131 °F)
Vapour pressure kPa at 20 °C (68 °F)	1.4	0.6	0.1
Volatility n-butyl acetate = 1	0.47	0.15	0.04
Autoignition temperature	240 °C (464 °F)	240 °C (464 °F)	230 °C (446 °F)
Explosion limits (Flammable Range) % by volume in air	0.6–6.5	0.6–6.5	0.6–8
Vapour density air=1	4.5–5	4.5–5	4.5–5
Refractive index at 20 °C (68 °F)	1.41–1.44	1.41–1.44	1.41–1.44
Viscosity cps, 25 °C (77 °F)	0.74–1.65	0.74–1.65	0.74–1.65
Solubility % by weight in water	< 0.1	< 0.1	< 0.1
Kauri-butanol value	29–33	29–33	29–33
Aniline point	60–75 °C (140–167 °F)	60–75 °C (140–167 °F)	60–75 °C (140–167 °F)
Reactivity	reaction with strong oxidizing agents		
Odor threshold mg/m^{3}	—	0.5–6	4

== Use ==
=== Degreasing and lubricating ===
In industry, white spirit is used for cleaning and degreasing machine tools and parts, and in conjunction with cutting oil as a thread cutting and reaming lubricant.

White spirit is commonly used for cutting fluid in ultraprecision lathes (commonly referred to as diamond turning machines).

White spirit is used for regripping golf clubs. After the old grip is removed, the white spirit is poured into the new grip and shaken. After the white spirit is poured on, the new underlying tape and the new grip are slid on. After an hour of drying out, the new grip and club are ready to use.

=== Solvent and paint thinner ===
White spirit is a petroleum distillate used as a paint thinner and mild solvent.

White spirit is an inexpensive petroleum-based replacement for the vegetable-based turpentine. It is commonly used as a paint thinner for oil-based paint and cleaning brushes, and as an organic solvent in other applications. Mineral turpentine is chemically very different from turpentine, which mainly consists of pinene, and it has inferior solvent properties. Artists use white spirit as an alternative to turpentine since it is less flammable and less toxic. Because of interactions with pigments in oil paints, artists require a higher grade of white spirit than many industrial users, including the complete absence of residual sulfur.

White spirit was formerly an active ingredient in the laundry soap Fels Naptha, used to dissolve oils and grease in laundry stains, and as a popular remedy for eliminating the irritant oil urushiol in poison ivy. It was removed as a potential health risk.

White spirit has a characteristic unpleasant kerosene-like odor. Chemical manufacturers have developed a low odor version of mineral turpentine which contains less of the highly volatile shorter hydrocarbons. Odorless mineral spirits is white spirit that has been further refined to remove the more toxic aromatic compounds, and is recommended for applications such as oil painting, where humans have close contact with the solvent.

In screen printing (also referred to as silk-screening), white spirit is often used to clean and unclog screens after printing with oil-based textile and plastisol inks. It is also used to thin inks used in making monoprints.

White spirit is often used inside liquid-filled compasses and gauges.

White spirits are a major ingredient in some popular automotive fuel/oil additives, such as Marvel Mystery Oil, as they are capable of dissolving varnish and sludge buildup.

=== Portable lanterns and stoves ===
Although white spirit is sometimes used as an alternative to camp fuel, such as kerosene or paraffin, in portable lanterns and camp stoves, this is highly inadvisable as typical grades of white spirit have a lower flash point than kerosene. It cannot be used as an alternative to Coleman camp fuel or white gas, which is a much more volatile gasoline-like fuel.

=== Other ===
White spirit is a contact herbicide, such as used by the Pachaug State Forest circa 1970. Mineral spirits helped control weeds in conifer seedbeds, but were not effective on all kinds, had no residual effect, required repeated applications dangerous to seedlings, and extensive hand-weeding was still needed.

== Toxicity ==
White spirit is mainly classed as an irritant. It has a fairly low acute toxicity by inhalation of the vapour, dermal (touching the skin) and oral (ingestion) routes. However, acute exposure can lead to central nervous system depression resulting in lack of coordination and slowed reactions. Exposure to very high concentrations in enclosed spaces can lead to general narcotic effects (drowsiness, dizziness, nausea, etc.) and can eventually lead to unconsciousness. Oral ingestion presents a high aspiration hazard. Prolonged or repeated skin exposure over a long period of time can result in severe irritant dermatitis, also called contact dermatitis.

Continuous exposure to an average white spirit concentration of 240 mg/m^{3} (40 ppm) for more than 13 years can lead to chronic central nervous system effects. Similar long-term studies have been made in which some of the observed effects included memory impairment, poor concentration, increased irritability etc. White spirit is implicated in the development of chronic toxic encephalopathy (CTE) among house painters. In severe cases CTE may lead to disability and personality changes. These effects in painters were first studied in the 1970s in the Nordic countries.

Owing to the volatility and low bioavailability of its constituents, white spirit, although it is moderately toxic to aquatic organisms, is unlikely to present significant hazards to the environment. It should not however, be purposely poured down the sink or freshwater drain.

People can be exposed to Stoddard solvent in the workplace by breathing it in, swallowing it, skin contact, and eye contact. The Occupational Safety and Health Administration (OSHA) has set the legal limit (permissible exposure limit) for Stoddard solvent exposure in the workplace as 500 ppm (2900 mg/m^{3}) over an 8-hour workday. The National Institute for Occupational Safety and Health (NIOSH) has set a recommended exposure limit (REL) of 350 mg/m^{3} over an 8-hour workday and 1800 mg/m^{3} over 15 minutes. At levels of 20,000 mg/m^{3}, Stoddard solvent is immediately dangerous to life and health.

== See also ==
- Naphtha, a combination of aliphatic hydrocarbons C_{5}–C_{12}
- Coleman fuel, a form of white gas used as a stove fuel
