= Trangia =

Brand of alcohol-burning stove

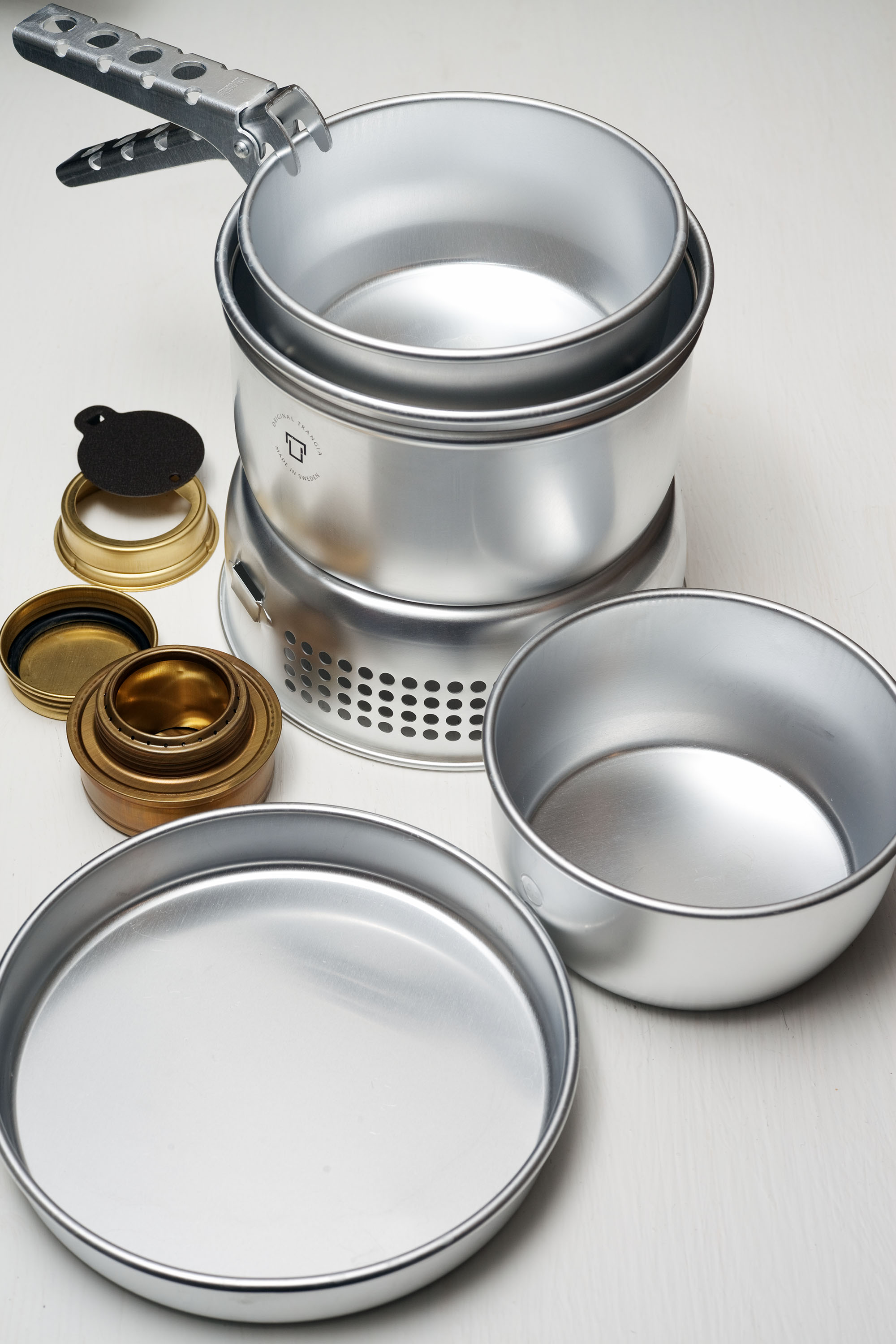
A one-two person Trangia 27, aluminium

Trangia is a line of alcohol-burning portable stoves manufactured by Swedish company Trangia AB in Trångsviken. These stoves are designed primarily for backpackers, with a focus on light weight, durability and simple design. The company began in 1925, selling cookware. The Trangia stove was developed by 1951. Trangia stoves were initially preferred to kerosene (paraffin) pressure stoves because they required only one type of fuel (alcohol, usually in the form of cheaper but deliberately poisonous methylated spirit). Trangia's selling point is that the entire packaged stove, including pots, is not significantly larger than a standard camp cooking pot. For this reason the Trangia has retained much of its popularity despite the development of alternative stove fuels and designs.

== Components ==
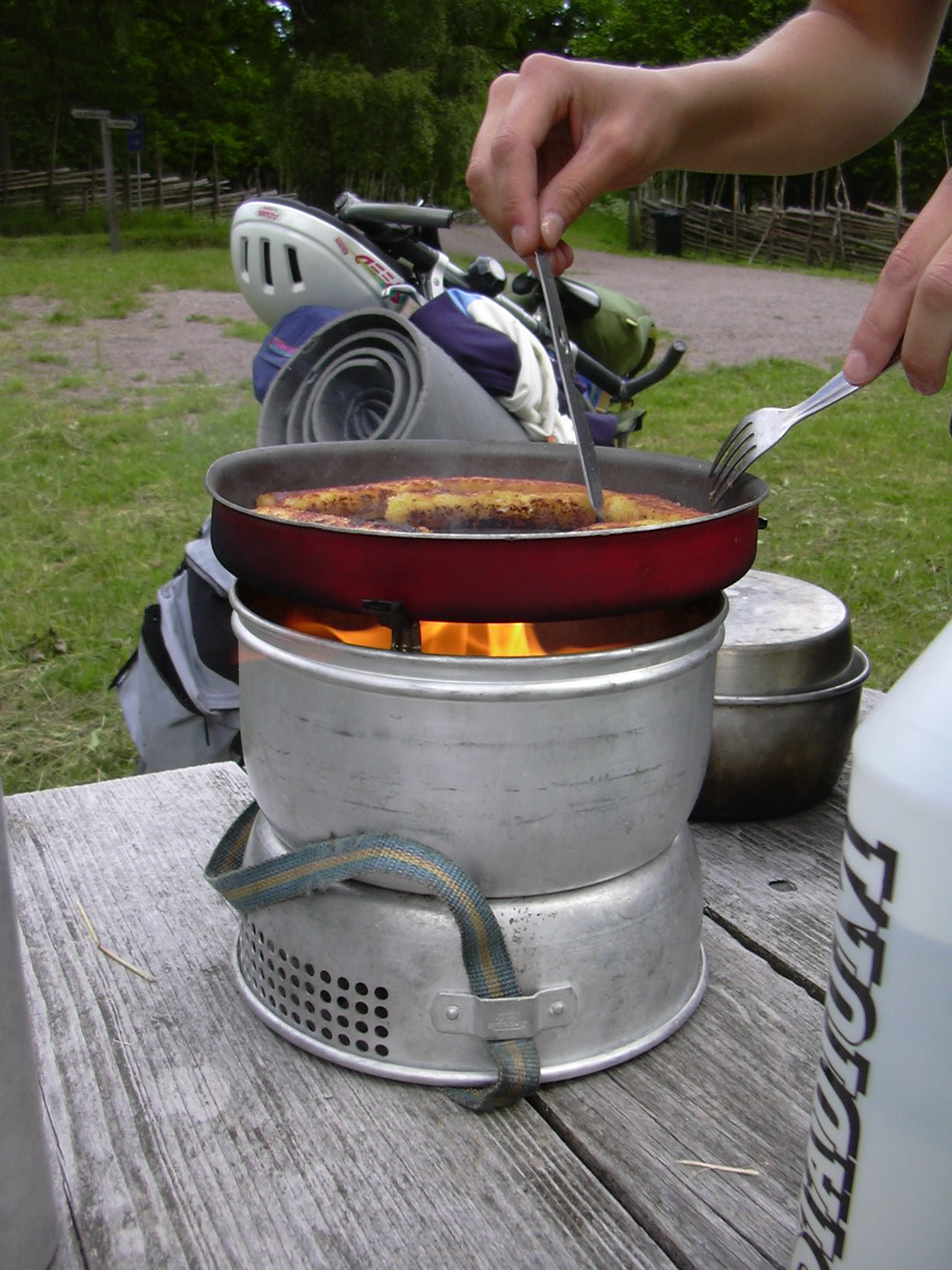
A Trangia stove in use

The standard stove set includes a base, which lifts the burner off the ground and has vents to provide airflow, and a windscreen, which protects the pot and flame (the latter leading to its Swedish nickname, the "stormkök", or "storm kitchen"). The standard stove also includes two billycans (pots), a pot lid/frying pan, an optional kettle and a handle, commonly referred to as a billy grip, used to grip onto the lip of the pots and pans. The entire set is designed to fit together in a single, portable package.

The burner is a small brass cup that looks and functions similar to a beverage-can stove, though it predates aluminium beverage can packaging. A bit of fuel is poured into the burner and ignited. The heat from the flame causes the fuel to vaporize, forcing it out of 23 or 24 jets around the top of the burner, where it ignites and produces a steady cooking flame. The burner includes a removable "simmer ring", which partially blocks the flame in order to reduce heat output and threaded lid.

Alternative burners are available allowing gas cartridges or white gasoline to fuel the Trangia.

== Types ==
Air-flow diagram of a Trangia stove

The standard stove sets come in several variants, with varying sizes of pots, some with non-stick finishes. The original model 25 was introduced in the 1950 catalogue. The smaller model 27 was introduced in the 1957 catalogue.

The Mini Trangia model 28, was introduced in the 1994 catalogue. It was specially produced for the multi-sport competition KIMM (Karrimor International Mountain Marathon). This consists of a standard burner (with simmer ring), small wind shield, 800 mL (28 imp fl oz) pot, 15 cm (5.9 in) frying pan and pot/pan grip (handle). The entire package weighs just 330 grams (12 ounces), according to Trangia's website. The Mini Trangia is much more portable than the standard-sized Trangia and is even lighter than most liquid-fuelled, pressure stoves (which don't include pots or pans in the weight). However, it is not as windproof as the full-size Trangias.

The Trangia Micro, introduced 2023, uses the same base as the Mini, includes a burner, a single pot with lid, holds 0,5L and weighs 282g.

Originally, Trangia stoves were made entirely from aluminium (except for the burner, which has always been brass), in order to reduce weight. However, aluminum is a poor cooking surface, as food sticks to it, it can add odd tastes to certain foods, and some have concerns about aluminum intake related to senile dementia. Later, Trangia introduced Teflon-coated pots and pans. These are better for cooking, though the Teflon is susceptible to flaking off over time. More recently introduced is cookware made from titanium, ultra-light aluminum, anodized ultra-light aluminum, and "Duossal" (a portmanteau of "duo", "stainless steel", and "aluminum"), which is aluminum with a stainless steel cooking surface.

== Users ==
The original and bestselling Trangia is the 25 model (or 25K with kettle) at 1.75 litres and around 850 g; it is recommended for 3-4 people. The smaller 27 model at 1 litre and 750 g is recommended for 1-2 people. All models use the same size burner. The smaller pan size of the 27 can reduce the tendency of both pan or frying pan to develop a central 'hot-spot' and burn if not watched - the same applies to gas powered models. The 27 has a more even heat. The 'Trangia kettle' has become something of an industry standard and other cooking stoves are even designed with its use in mind.

Trangia cookware continues to be popular with cycletourists where the extra bulk and weight over some of the ultra-lightweight alternatives is less critical and more than compensated for by the advantages. The fuel is cheap and available in almost all countries from supermarkets. This means users are more likely to do more complex dishes safe in the knowledge they won't be out of fuel, simmer times between fuel refills being 15+ minutes. Disadvantages of a meths burner include sooting of pans, and lower output power which gives longer times to boil, compared with gas.

The stove is also notably safe and easy to use and for this reason is popular with youth organisations such as The Scout Association. The Methylated Spirit fuel is not unpleasant like petrol or paraffin and any spillage quickly evaporates. There is no danger of explosion though care must be taken when refilling as the flame can be almost invisible and it is vital that the user is 100% sure the burner is out when refilled. Correct fuel bottles from Trangia or Sigg for example have a small pouring hole that will prevent flame jumping back into the bottle if a mistake is made.

A similar burner produced by Trangia is also a component in the Swedish military mess kit. The Finnish Defence Forces use the Trangia, given to soldiers when needed and does not form part of the basic equipment.

== See also ==
- Portable stove
- Billycan
