= Beverage-can stove =

Alcohol stove of DIY construction

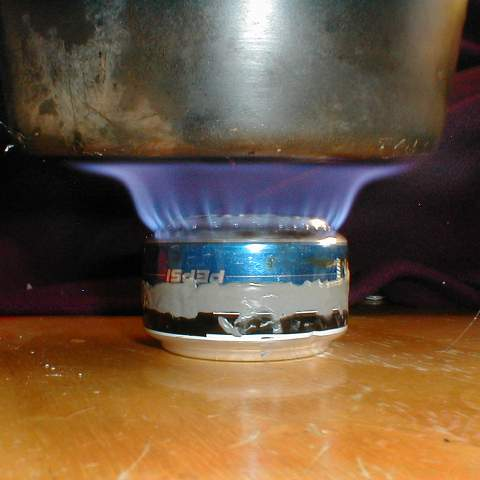
A beverage-can stove, with the pot stand omitted for clarity

A beverage-can stove, also called a soda-can stove or pop-can stove, is a do it yourself, ultralight, alcohol-burning portable stove. It is made using parts from two aluminium beverage cans. Basic designs can be relatively simple, but many variations exist.

Total weight, including a windscreen/stand, can be less than one ounce (28 g). The design is popular in ultralight backpacking due to its low cost and lighter weight than commercial stoves. This advantage may be lost on long hiking trips, where a lot of fuel is packed, since alcohol has less energy per gram than some other stove fuels.

Of the available fuels, methanol delivers the least energy, isopropyl alcohol delivers more, pure ethanol the most; butanol is hardly ever used. Denatured alcohol and rubbing alcohol are frequently used for this purpose, as it often contains a mixture of ethanol and other alcohols. All but isopropyl alcohol burn with a smokeless flame; it can provide both light and heat.

== History and design ==
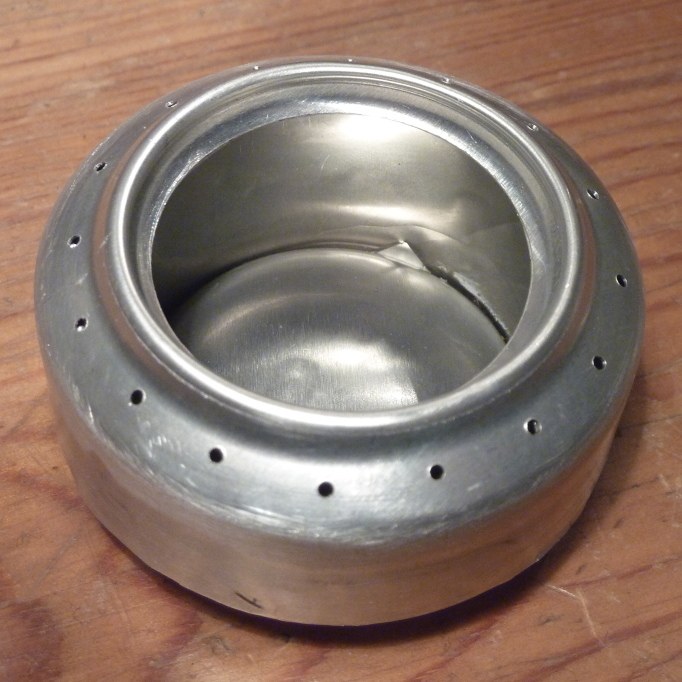
A three-piece aluminium beverage-can stove. Note the small triangular hole cut in the bottom of the inner wall

The basic design dates back more than a century. It consists of a double-wall gas generator, a perforated burner ring, and an inner preheat chamber. A similar design was patented in 1904 by New York coppersmith J. Heinrichs. Trangia has been selling a commercial version of the design since 1925, and Safesport marketed a stainless-steel stove in the 1990s. The Trangia stove burner is made from brass, although all the other associated parts that come with it are aluminium.

In the unpressurized open-top design the double wall acts as a gas generator, transferring heat from the flame to the fuel. This effect enhances combustion, producing more heat than other passive designs. The inner wall also creates a convenient preheat chamber for starting the stove. Once the fuel has warmed up, its vapor will travel up the hollow wall, pass through the perforations, and form a ring of flame. This improves air/fuel mixing and therefore combustion. Vapor also rises from the center of the stove and burns when passing through the ring of flame as long as a pot is over the stove.

Pressurized designs have no cut-out in the top. They are filled with alcohol by separating the two halves of the burner, by opening a plug to a smaller hole in the center of the top side or by filling through the gas-jet holes.

A wick may be inserted into the hollow wall, where it will draw fuel upwards closer to the hot parts of the burner. Evaporating fuel from the wick removes heat from the top parts of the burner and subsequently the fuel at the bottom receives less heat. This slows down evaporation through the center while increasing the gas pressure inside the wall, spreading the ring of flame outwards, inwards, or vertically depending on the jet directions, while the center of the burner produces almost no flame, leading to a more controlled burn and faster starting. Suitable wick materials include fiberglass or cotton cloth. The wick will not burn because the evaporating fuel keeps it cool; also the pressure inside prevents oxygen from entering the hollow until the burner can no longer produce enough gas to support a flame. Cellulose cigarette filters wick fuel efficiently upwards but melt and burn in all but the least powerful designs. Other wick materials in use are Kevlar and other aramid fibers, carbon felt, fiberglass, and even toilet paper.

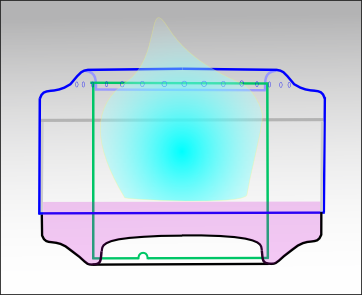
Fuel is poured into the stove and ignited, burning in the center.

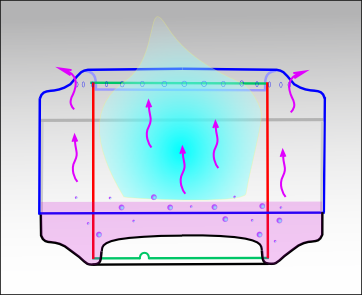
The flame heats the fuel and interior of the stove, causing the fuel to vaporize.

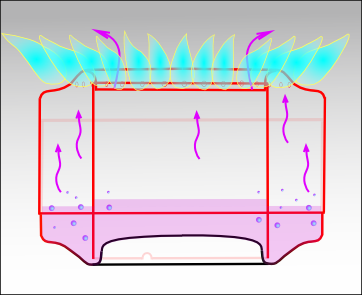
When the temperature is high enough, vapor pressure causes fuel jets and a ring of flame.

== Aluminium-can construction ==
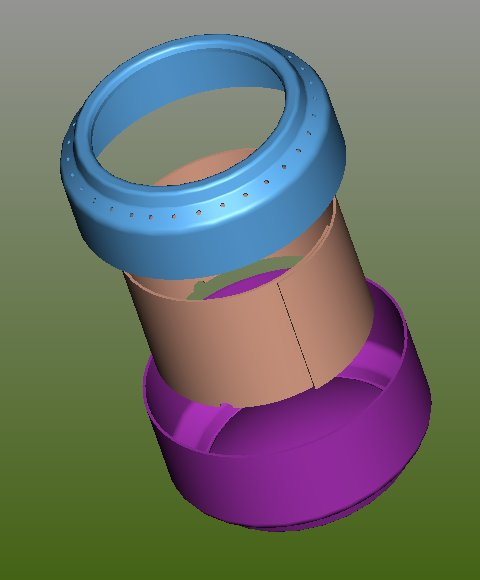
Three-piece beverage-can stove (exploded view).

The stove is made from two aluminium can bottoms. An inner wall is cut and rolled from the can material. A ring of holes is pierced into the top with a pin. Parts can be glued with silicone sealant, high-temperature epoxy, or sealed with aluminum (thermal) foil tape, although this is not necessary. Total height is less than two inches (50 mm), though dimensions may be increased to hold more fuel or decreased to take up even less space.

The choice of aluminium has several advantages—light weight, low cost, and good thermal conductivity to aid vaporization of fuel. Modifications to the surface such as inking or painting a dark color increase the amount of radiant thermal energy captured by the stove body and change the stove's burn profile as a function of time, fuel load, and ambient temperature. Many designs require priming to get started and most are regenerative and stable during operation. Alternative construction materials have been used, including stoves made of tin cans such as cat food tins, tuna cans, and juice cans—the basic design is very similar. Windscreens/stands can be fabricated from tin cans, cut to size with ventilation holes added. Steel beverage cans of the classic twelve ounces (340 g) design are still in limited use and while they are heat resistant, their coating will burn off and they will rust if not cared for.

== Operation and performance ==
Each stove works well to supply one or two people. When used to cook larger meals (greater than 2 cups (500 mL)), it is less efficient than a more-powerful stove which delivers more heat to a pot. This is because a longer time is required to reach the boiling temperature, during which more heat is lost to the surroundings.

To use the stove, a small amount of fuel is poured into the stove and ignited. The pot is then placed above the stove, on a windscreen or stand. The flame is small at first, only burning from the inner chamber. Once the fuel has warmed up (requiring about one minute) its vapor will pass through the perforations and form a ring of flame. Enough heat from the flame is passed to the fuel to maintain full combustion until the fuel runs out.

=== Ratings ===
- Time to boil 2 cups (500 mL): ~4–12 minutes (45 mL of fuel)
- Time to boil 4 cups (1 L): ~10–24 minutes (90 mL of fuel)
- Burn time: ~10–20 minutes (60 mL/4 tablespoons of fuel)

Boil times can be significantly reduced by using a pot of the appropriate diameter (to reduce heat loss on the sides of the pot) and especially by a wind screen which maximizes efficiency.

- Time to boil 2 cups (500 mL): ~5 minutes at 6500 ft (2000m) altitude with ambient temp of ~45F (7C) and water temp of ~55F (13C).

=== Comparison with other stoves ===
The stove can outperform some commercial models in cold or high-altitude environments, where propane and butane canisters might fail. Roland Mueser, in Long-Distance Hiking, surveyed hikers on the Appalachian Trail and found that this stove was the only design with a zero-percent failure rate.

Fuel usage (by weight) is about fifty percent greater than a butane/propane stove. Can stoves weigh less than one ounce (28 g), compared with three ounces (85 g) for the lightest gas stoves. Many commercial stoves also require special fuel canisters, adding to overall stove weight. No such canisters are necessary in a can stove; denatured alcohol can be carried in virtually any lightweight container, such as a plastic soda bottle. The weight advantage of the beverage-can stove is diminished by the greater fuel consumption (especially on longer hikes), but may still be offset by its reliability and simplicity.

Other attributes of the beverage-can stove are its nearly silent operation and its suitability as an emergency backup.

- Denatured alcohol is a (relatively) environmentally-friendly fuel that does not leave a residue or soot. Denatured alcohol is commonly available at camping outfitters and hardware stores. Denatured alcohol is toxic to drink.
- Non-toxic pure ethanol is rarely used as stove fuel in the United States, since it is usually subject to a liquor tax. However it also has some medicinal use in treating stings and bites, as a coolant, and antiseptic.
- These stoves operate marginally on 90% isopropyl alcohol, poorly on 70% and not at all with 50%. Water typically cannot be boiled with isopropyl rubbing alcohol, but if the more rarely found (still inexpensive) laboratory grade or "gas drier" is used, and the sooting is dealt with by applying a little soap solution to the pot, the fuel value of the alcohol will reduce boiling times, not increase them.

== Variations ==
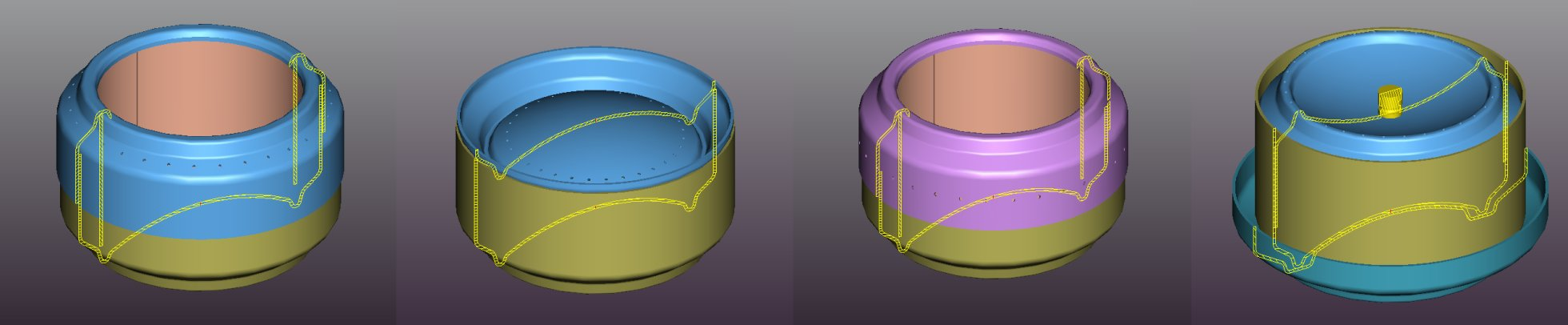
Beverage-can stove variations with cross sections in yellow. From left to right—standard design; inverted two-piece; side-burner; pressurized.

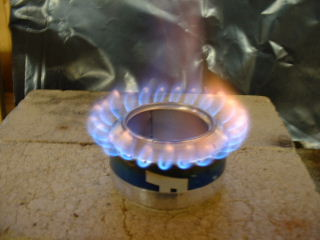
A side-burner stove built from a single can as part of a Scouting project

Standard
The classic ultra-lightweight backpacking stove. Designed for one person, lighter than commercial models of the same design
Inverted two-piece
Smaller and lighter than the standard version; difficult to fill
Side-burner
Doubles as its own pot stand (holes are in the side). A tight-fitting pot can increase fuel pressure
Pressurized
A more powerful version. A hole in the top of the stove is sealed with a thumbscrew after filling with fuel; this allows the stove to control the rate of heat output. An additional base is used to hold fuel for preheating
Back-pressured
Back-pressured stoves simplify the pressurized design by eliminating the thumbscrew and the base needed for preheating, while still controlling the rate of energy output
Insulated
A variation on the standard design, with an inner wall and insulated with fiberglass
Other
Numerous designs in use
Multiple-unit
More than one unit can be used under the same pot when cooking for a larger number of people

== Safety issues ==
Alcohol burns with an invisible flame, resulting in higher potential for burns. Additionally, burning fuel can be spilled. If fuel is added while a flame is burning, an explosion that propels flames towards the user and bystanders can occur, in a phenomenon known as flame jetting. These flames can cause third degree burns in one second. For these reasons, the United States Consumer Product Safety Commission urges consumers to not use fire pits that burn a pool of alcohol or other fuel.

For stove with a deep well, blowing into them can propel burning alcohol towards the user. A stove with a small, shallow well, or a central wick may or may not be blown out to stop it from burning. A safe and lightweight snuff cap or simmer ring is added to some stove designs.

Alcohol fires can be extinguished with plain water, and alcohol fumes are mostly non-explosive.

The Boy Scouts of America prohibits "equipment that is handcrafted... due to legal concerns. Examples include alcohol-burning 'can' stoves..."

== See also ==
- Alcohol burner
- List of stoves
- Outdoor cooking
- Repurposing
- Rocket stove
- Solar cooker
