= Coleman fuel =

Petroleum naphtha product

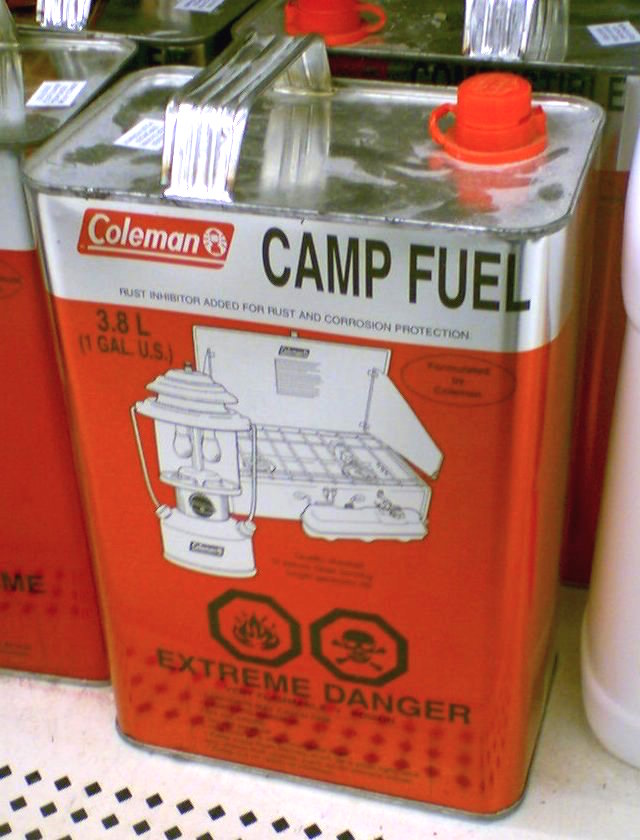
A gallon can of Coleman Camp Fuel, a common naphtha-based fuel used in many lanterns and stoves

Coleman fuel is a proprietary petroleum naphtha product marketed by the Coleman Company. A generally similar flammable fluid is generically sold as white gas.

== Contents ==
Historically called white gas, it is a liquid petroleum fuel (100% light hydrotreated distillate). White gas was originally simply additive-free gasoline. This formulation is now rarely found. Coleman fuel, and other white gases, contain additives for inhibiting rust, ease of lighting, and fast burning. It also burns cleaner than the original white gas.

== Use ==
Coleman fuel is used primarily for fueling lanterns and camp stoves. It is usually sold in one-gallon cans in the United States; in Europe it is usually sold in one-litre bottles.

Originally, it was simply casing-head gas or drip gas, which has similar properties. Drip gas was sold commercially at gas stations and hardware stores in North America until the early 1950s. The white gas sold today is a similar product but is produced at refineries and has a very low benzene content, benzene being a human carcinogen.

Though Coleman fuel has an octane rating of 50 to 55 and a flammability similar to gasoline, it has none of the additives found in modern gasoline. Most burners will readily burn unleaded gasoline as a substitute fuel; however, the additives can cause more carbonization inside the burner's pipes than white gas, and this is generally not recommended without extra replacement pipes and service to clean the pipes every 30-40 hours.

== See also ==
- Naphtha
- Drip gas
