= Petroleum naphtha =

Petroleum product

Petroleum naphtha is an intermediate hydrocarbon liquid stream derived from the refining of crude oil with CAS-no 64742-48-9. It is most usually desulfurized and then catalytically reformed, which rearranges or restructures the hydrocarbon molecules in the naphtha as well as breaking some of the molecules into smaller molecules to produce a high-octane component of gasoline (or petrol).

There are hundreds of different petroleum crude oil sources worldwide and each crude oil has its own unique composition or assay. There are also hundreds of petroleum refineries worldwide and each of them is designed to process either a specific crude oil or specific types of crude oils. Naphtha is a general term as each refinery produces its own naphthas with their own unique initial and final boiling points and other physical and compositional characteristics.

Naphthas may also be produced from other material such as coal tar, shale deposits, tar sands, and the destructive distillation of wood.

== Sources ==
The first unit operation (after being desalinated) in a petroleum refinery is the crude oil distillation unit. The overhead liquid distillate from that unit is called virgin or straight-run naphtha and that distillate is the largest source of naphtha in most petroleum refineries. The naphtha is a mixture of many different hydrocarbon compounds. It has an initial boiling point (IBP) of about 35 °C and a final boiling point (FBP) of about 200 °C, and it contains paraffins, naphthenes (cyclic paraffins) and aromatic hydrocarbons ranging from those containing 4 carbon atoms to those containing about 10 or 11 carbon atoms.

The virgin naphtha is often further distilled into two streams:

- a virgin light naphtha with an IBP of about 30 °C and a FBP of about 145 °C containing most (but not all) of the hydrocarbons with six or fewer carbon atoms
- a virgin heavy naphtha containing most (but not all) of the hydrocarbons with more than six carbon atoms. The heavy naphtha has an IBP of about 140 °C and a FBP of about 205 °C.

The virgin heavy naphtha is usually processed in a catalytic reformer, because the light naphtha has molecules with six or fewer carbon atoms—which, when reformed, tend to crack into butane and lower molecular weight hydrocarbons that are not useful as high-octane gasoline blending components. Also, the molecules with six carbon atoms tend to form aromatics, which is undesirable because the environmental regulations of a number of countries limit the amount of aromatics (most particularly benzene) in gasoline.

== Types of virgin naphthas ==
The table below lists some typical virgin heavy naphthas, available for catalytic reforming, derived from various crude oils. It can be seen that they differ significantly in their content of paraffins, naphthenes and aromatics:

Typical heavy naphthas
Crude oil name $\Rightarrow$ Location $\Rightarrow$	Barrow Island Australia	Mutineer-Exeter Australia	CPC Blend Kazakhstan	Draugen North Sea
Initial boiling point, °C	150	140	149	150
Final boiling point, °C	200	190	204	180
Paraffins, liquid volume %	46	62	57	38
Naphthenes, liquid volume %	42	32	27	45
Aromatics, liquid volume %	12	6	16	17

== Cracked naphthas ==
Some refinery naphthas also contain some olefinic (alkene-containing) hydrocarbons, such as naphthas derived from the fluid catalytic cracking, visbreakers and coking processes used in many refineries. Those olefin-containing naphthas are often referred to as cracked naphthas.

In some petroleum refineries, the cracked naphthas are desulfurized and catalytically reformed (as are the virgin naphthas) to produce additional high-octane gasoline components.

== Other uses ==
Some petroleum refineries also produce small amounts of specialty naphthas for use as solvents, cleaning fluids and dry-cleaning agents, paint and varnish diluents, asphalt diluents, rubber industry solvents, recycling products, and cigarette-lighter, portable-camping-stove and lantern fuels. Those specialty naphthas are subjected to various purification processes which adjust chemical characteristics to suit specific needs.

On a much larger scale, petroleum naphtha is also used in the petrochemicals industry as feedstock to steam reformers and steam crackers for the production of hydrogen, ethylene, and other olefins.

== Safety ==
People can be exposed to petroleum naphtha in the workplace by breathing it, swallowing it, skin contact, and eye contact. The Occupational Safety and Health Administration (OSHA) set the legal limit (permissible exposure limit) for petroleum naphtha exposure in the workplace as 500 ppm (2000 mg/m^{3}) over an 8-hour workday. The National Institute for Occupational Safety and Health (NIOSH) has set a recommended exposure limit (REL) of 350 mg/m^{3} over an 8-hour workday and 1800 mg/m^{3} over 15 minutes. At levels of 1100 ppm, 10% of the lower explosive limit, petroleum naphtha is immediately dangerous to life and health.
