= Barbecue grill =

Device for barbecueing or grilling

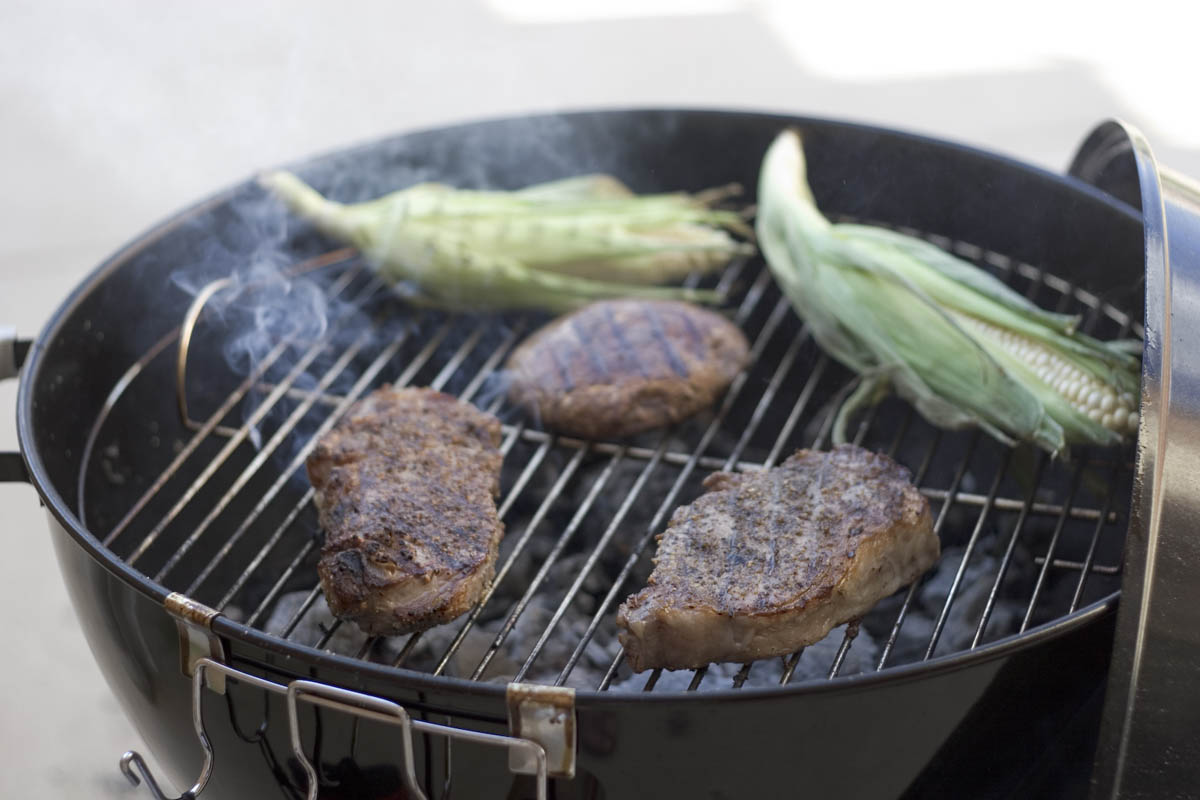
Food cooking on a charcoal grill

A barbecue grill or barbeque grill (known as a barbecue in Canada and barbecue or barbie in Australia and New Zealand) is a device that cooks food by applying heat from below. There are several varieties of grills, with most falling into one of three categories: gas-fueled, charcoal, or electric. There is debate over which method yields superior results.

== History in the Americas ==
Grilling has existed in the Americas since pre-colonial times. The Arawak people of South America roasted meat on a wooden structure called a barbacoa in Spanish. For centuries, the term barbacoa referred to the wooden structure and not the act of grilling, but it was eventually modified to "barbecue". It was also applied to the pit-style cooking techniques now frequently used in the southeastern United States. Barbecue was originally used to slow-cook hogs; however, different ways of preparing food led to regional variations. Over time, other foods were cooked in a similar fashion, with hamburgers and hot dogs being recent additions.

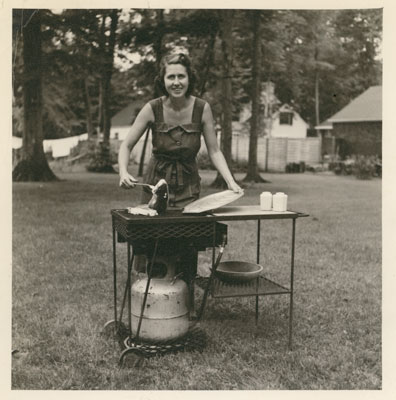
The LazyMan Model AP, the world's first portable gas grill. Taken during the summer of 1954.

Edward G. Kingsford invented the modern charcoal briquette. Kingsford was a relative of Henry Ford who assigned him the task of establishing a Ford auto parts plant and sawmill in northern Michigan, a challenge that Kingsford embraced. The local community grew and was named Kingsford in his honor. Kingsford noticed that Ford's Model T production lines were generating a large amount of wood scraps that were being discarded. He suggested to Ford that a charcoal manufacturing facility be established next to the assembly line to process and sell charcoal under the Ford name at Ford dealerships. Several years after Kingsford's death, the chemical company was sold to local businessmen and renamed the Kingsford Chemical Company.

George Stephen created the iconic hemispherical grill design, jokingly called "Sputnik" by Stephen's neighbors. Stephen, a welder, worked for Weber Brothers Metal Works, a metal fabrication shop primarily concerned with welding steel spheres together to make buoys. Stephen was tired of the wind blowing ash onto his food when he grilled so he took the lower half of a buoy, welded three steel legs onto it, and fabricated a shallower hemisphere for use as a lid. He took the results home and following some initial success, started the Weber-Stephen Products Company.

The gas grill was invented in the late 1930s by Don McGlaughlin, owner of the Chicago Combustion Corporation, known today as LazyMan. McGlaughlin invented the first built-in grill from the successful gas broiler called BROILBURGER. These first Lazy-Man grills were marketed as "open-fire charcoal-type gas broilers" which featured "permanent coals", otherwise known as lava rock. In the 1950s, most residential households did not have a barbecue, so the term broiler was used for marketing purposes to commercial establishments. The gas open-broiler design was adapted into the first portable gas grill in 1954 by Chicago Combustion Corporation as the Model AP. McGlaughlin's portable design was the first to feature the use of the 20-lb propane cylinders, which previously were exclusively used by plumbers as a fuel source.

== Types ==
=== Electric ===
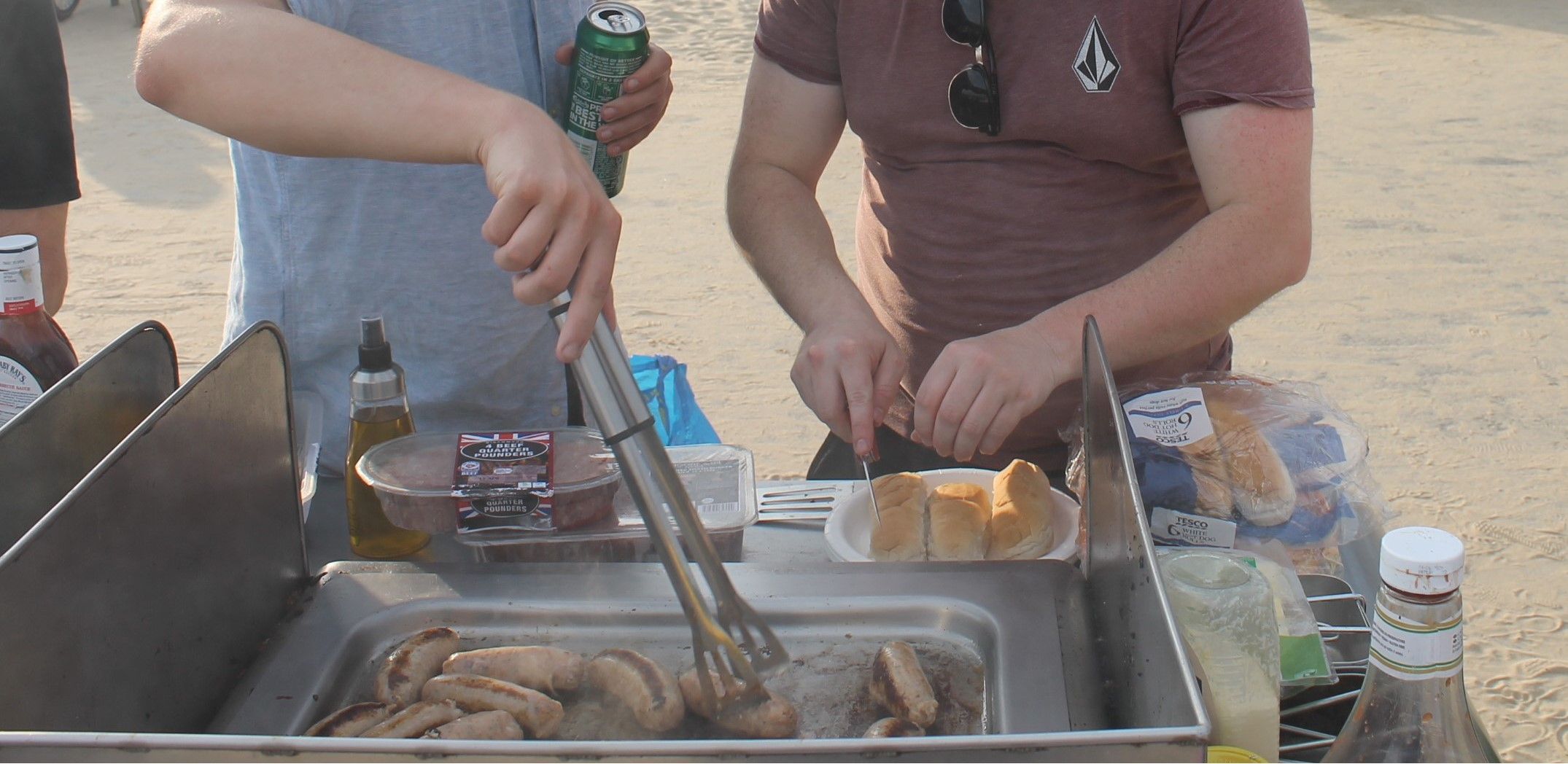
Electric Barbecue in use

With an electric grill, the heating comes from an electric heating element. Neither coal nor briquettes are needed.

=== Gas ===
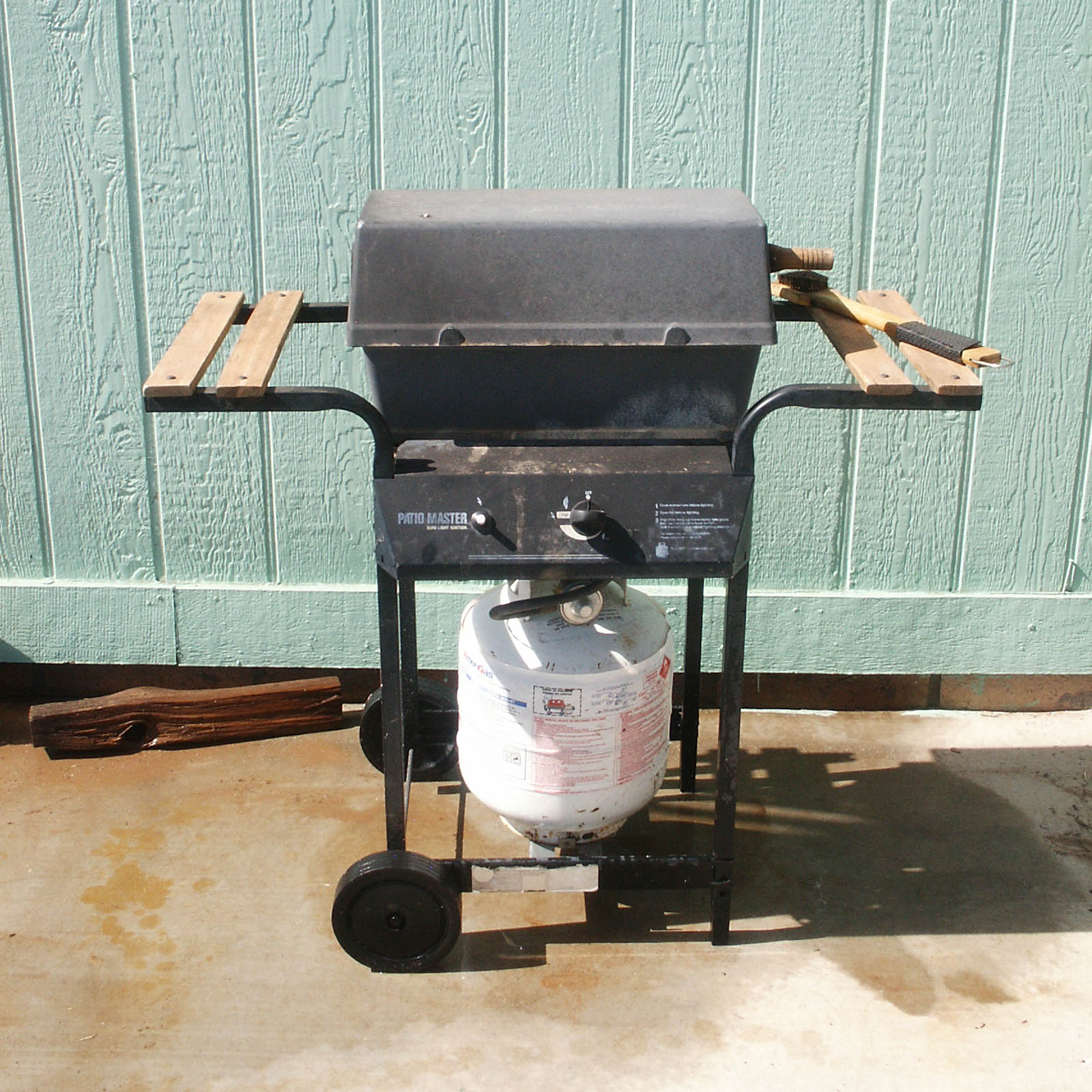
A single-burner propane gas grill that conforms to the cart grill design common among gas grills

Gas-fueled grills typically use propane or butane (liquified petroleum gas) or natural gas as their fuel source, with the gas flame either cooking food directly or heating grilling elements which in turn radiate the heat necessary to cook food. Gas grills are available in sizes ranging from small, single steak grills up to large, industrial sized restaurant grills which are able to cook enough meat to feed a hundred or more people. According to Better Homes and Gardens magazine, "gas grills are easier to start and generally heat up faster than charcoal grills."

Some gas grills can be switched between using liquified petroleum gas and natural gas fuel, although this requires physically changing key components including burners and regulator valves.

The majority of gas grills follow the cart grill design concept: the grill unit itself is attached to a wheeled frame that holds the fuel tank. The wheeled frame may also support side tables, storage compartments, and other features.

A recent trend in gas grills is for manufacturers to add an infrared radiant burner to the back of the grill enclosure. This radiant burner provides an even heat across the burner and is intended for use with a horizontal rotisserie. A meat item (whole chicken, beef roast, pork loin roast) is placed on a metal skewer that is rotated by an electric motor. Smaller cuts of meat can be grilled in this manner using a round metal basket that slips over the metal skewer.

Another type of gas grill gaining popularity is called a flattop grill. According to Hearth and Home magazine, flattop grills "on which food cooks on a griddle-like surface and is not exposed to an open flame at all" is an emerging trend in the outdoor grilling market.

A small metal "smoker box" containing wood chips may be used on a gas grill to give a smoky flavor to the grilled foods. Barbecue purists would argue that to get a true smoky flavor (and smoke ring) the user has to cook low and slow, indirectly and using wood or charcoal; gas grills are difficult to maintain at the low temperatures required (~225-250 °F), especially for extended periods.

=== Infrared ===
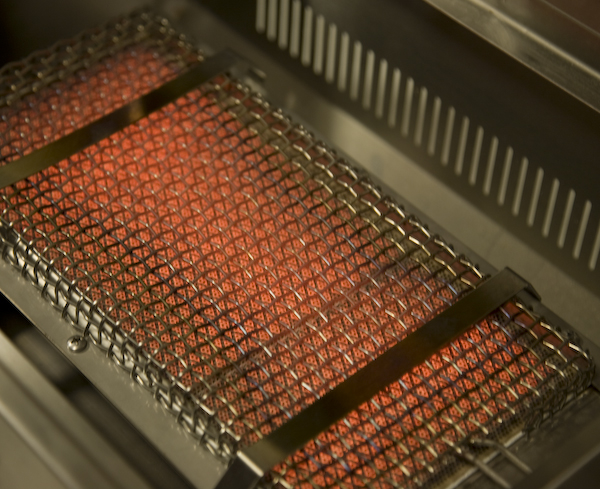
An ignited Infrared grill burner, only seeing the visible light spectrum

Infrared grills work by igniting a gas fuel to heat a ceramic tile, causing it to emit infrared radiation by which the food is cooked. The thermal radiation is generated when heat from the movement of charged particles within atoms is converted to electromagnetic radiation in the infrared heat frequency range. Infrared grills allow users to more easily adjust cooking temperature than charcoal grills, and are usually able to reach higher temperatures than standard gas grills, making them popular for searing items quickly.

=== Charcoal ===
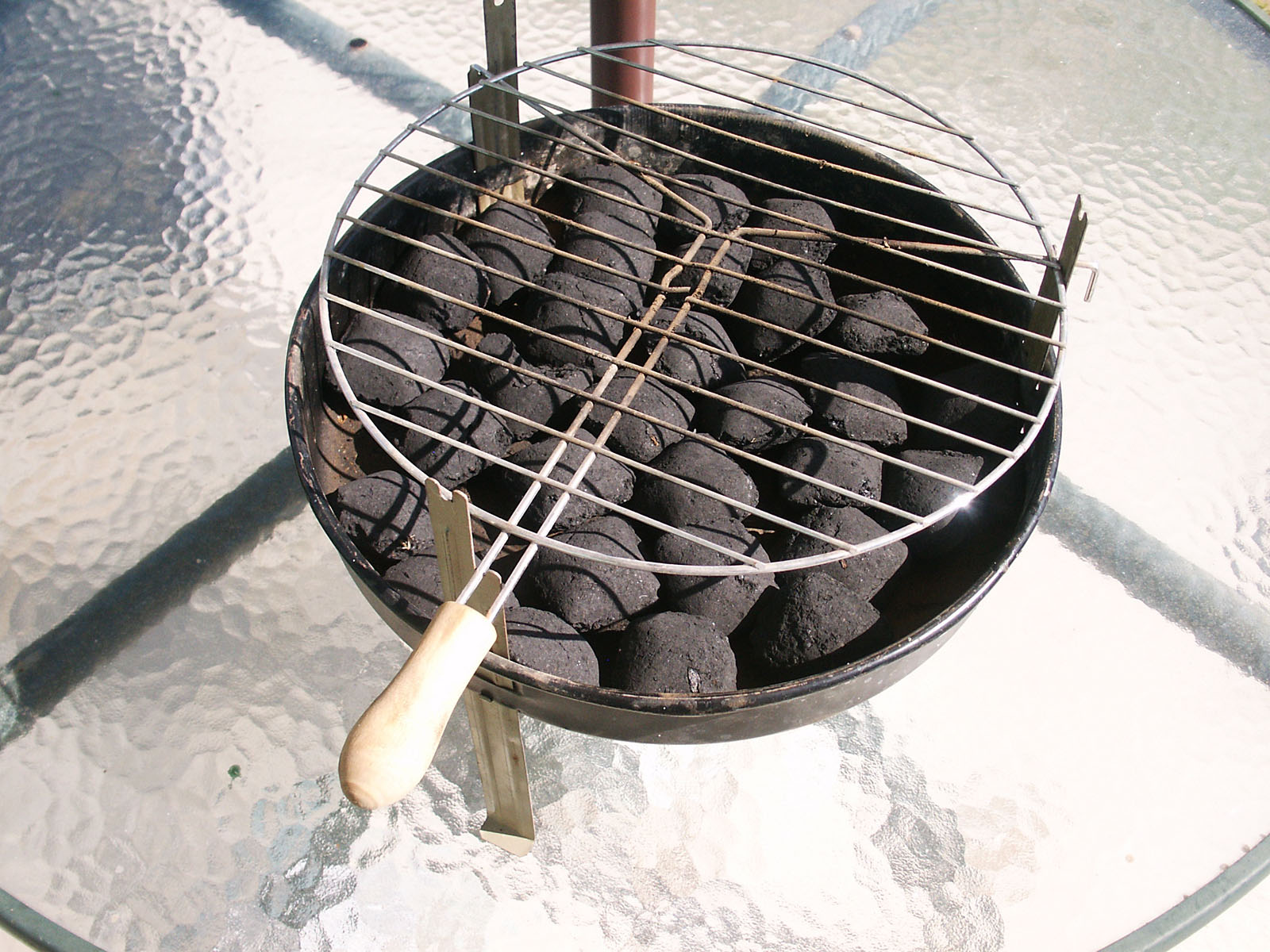
A brazier grill loaded with fresh charcoal briquettes

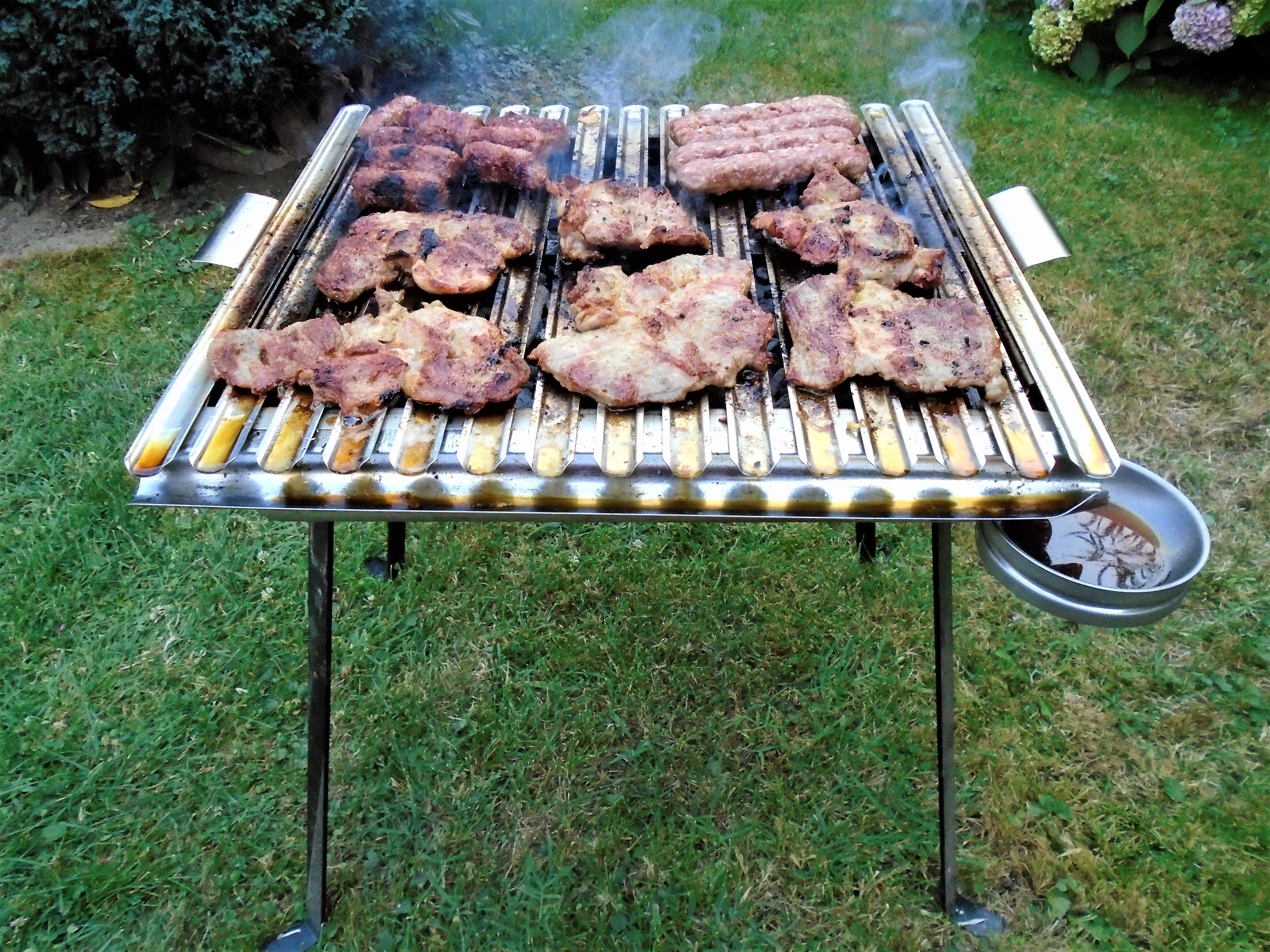
Various pork dishes on a charcoal grill

Charcoal grills use either charcoal briquettes or natural lump charcoal as their fuel source. When burned, the charcoal will transform into embers radiating the heat necessary to cook food.

There is contention among grilling enthusiasts on what type of charcoal is best for grilling. Users of charcoal briquettes emphasize the uniformity in size, burn rate, heat creation, and quality exemplified by briquettes. Users of all-natural lump charcoal emphasize its subtle smoky aromas, high heat production, and the lack of binders and fillers often present in briquettes.

There are many different charcoal grill configurations. Grills can be square, round, or rectangular, some have lids while others do not, and they may or may not have a venting system for heat control. The majority of charcoal grills, however, fall into the following categories:

==== Brazier ====
The simplest and most inexpensive of charcoal grills, the brazier grill is made of wire and sheet metal and composed of a cooking grid placed over a charcoal pan. Usually the grill is supported by legs attached to the charcoal pan. The brazier grill does not have a lid or venting system. Heat is adjusted by moving the cooking grid up or down over the charcoal pan. Even after George Stephen invented the kettle grill in the early 1950s, the brazier grill remained a dominant charcoal grill type for a number of years. Brazier grills are available at most discount department stores during the summer.

==== Pellet grill ====
Pellet technology is widely used in home heating in certain parts of North America. Softer woods including pine are often used for home heating. Pellets for home heating are not cooking-grade and should not be used in pellet grills.

==== Square charcoal ====
The square charcoal grill is a hybrid of the brazier and the kettle grill. It has a shallow pan like the brazier and normally a simple method of adjusting the heat, if any. However, it has a lid like a kettle grill and basic adjustable vents. The square charcoal grille is, as expected, priced between the brazier and kettle grill, with the most basic models priced around the same as the most expensive braziers and the most expensive models competing with basic kettle grills. These grills are available at discount stores and have largely displaced most larger braziers. Square charcoal grills almost exclusively have four legs with two wheels on the back so the grill can be tilted back using the handles for the lid to roll the grill. More expensive examples have baskets and shelves mounted on the grill.

==== Shichirin (hibachi) ====
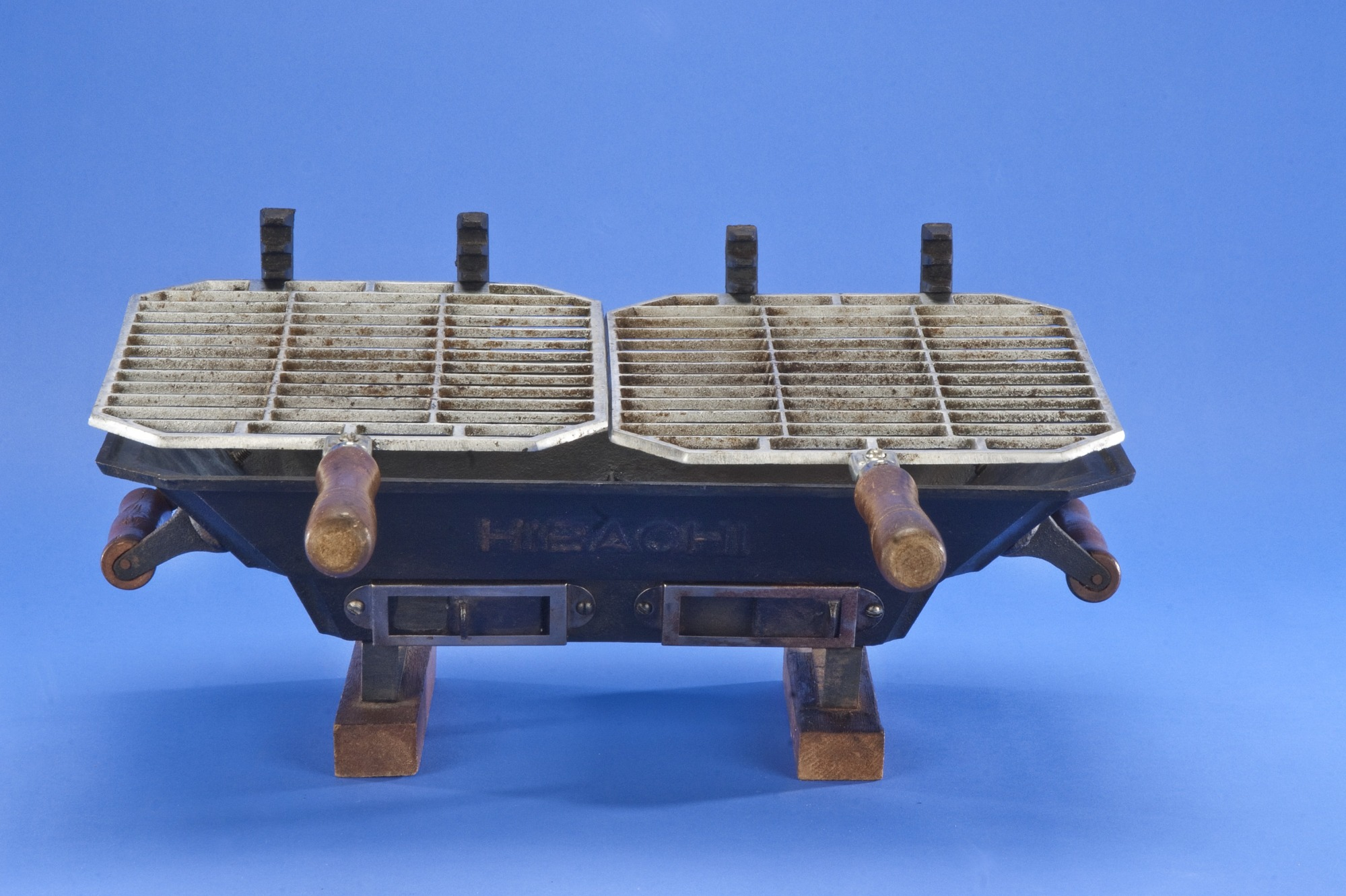
North American Hibachi charcoal heated grill made from cast iron

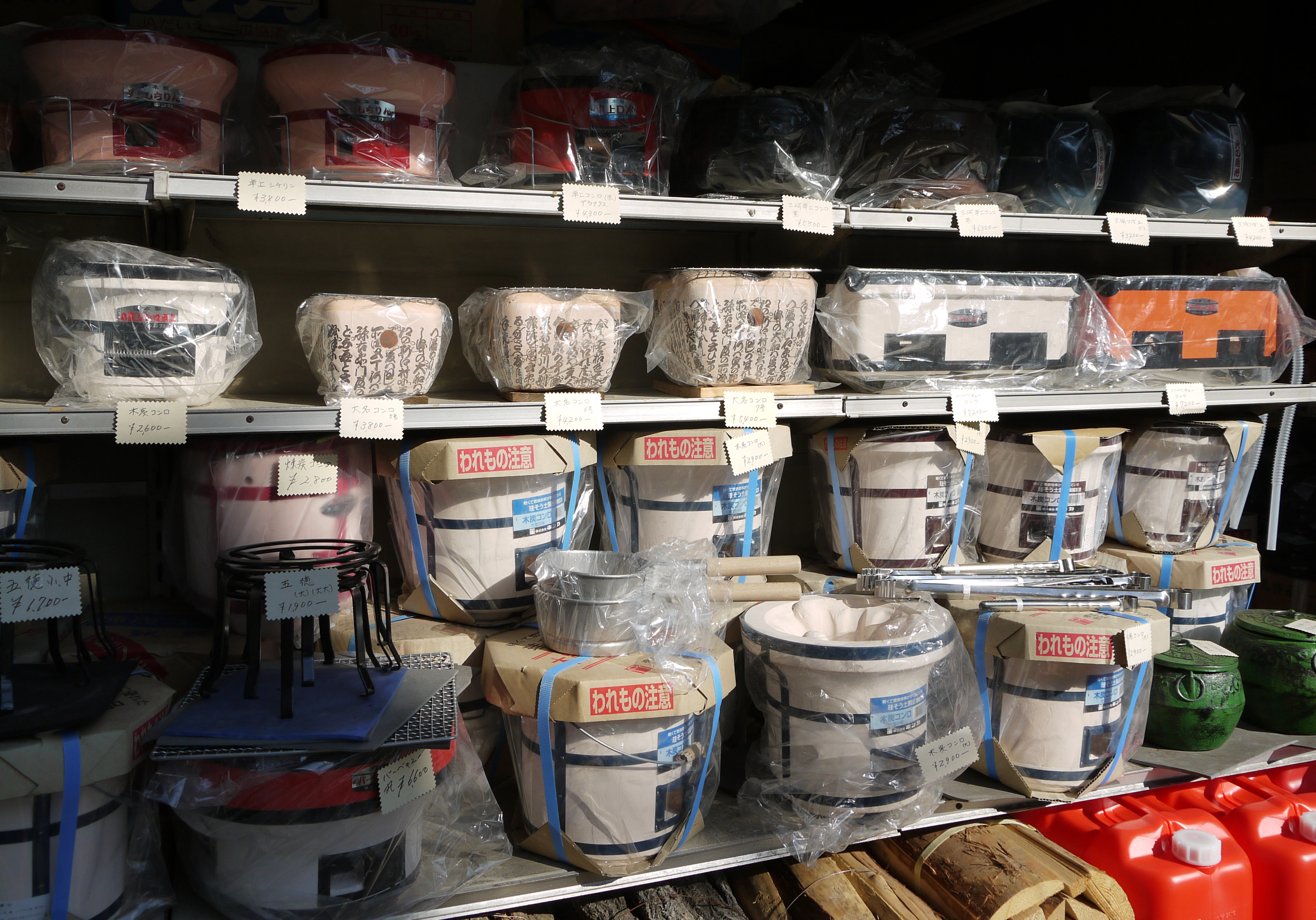
Various Japanese traditional shichirin (Tokyo Egota), made from diatomite

The traditional Japanese hibachi is a heating device and not usually used for cooking. In English, however, "hibachi" often refers to small cooking grills typically made of aluminum or cast iron, with the latter generally being of a higher quality. Owing to their small size, hibachi grills are popular as a form of portable barbecue. They resemble traditional, Japanese, charcoal-heated cooking utensils called shichirin.

Alternatively, "hibachi-style" is often used in the U.S. as a term for Japanese teppanyaki cooking, in which gas-heated hotplates are integrated into tables around which many people (often multiple parties) can sit and eat at once. The chef performs the cooking in front of the diners, typically with theatrical flair—such as lighting a volcano-shaped stack of raw onion hoops on fire.

In its most common form, the hibachi is an inexpensive grill made of either sheet steel or cast iron and composed of a charcoal pan and two small, independent cooking grids. Like the brazier grill, heat is adjusted by moving the cooking grids up and down. Also like the brazier grill, the hibachi does not have a lid. Some hibachi designs have venting systems for heat control. The hibachi is a good grill choice for those who do not have much space for a larger grill, or those who wish to take their grill traveling. Binchō-tan is most suitable for fuel of shichirin.

==== Kettle ====
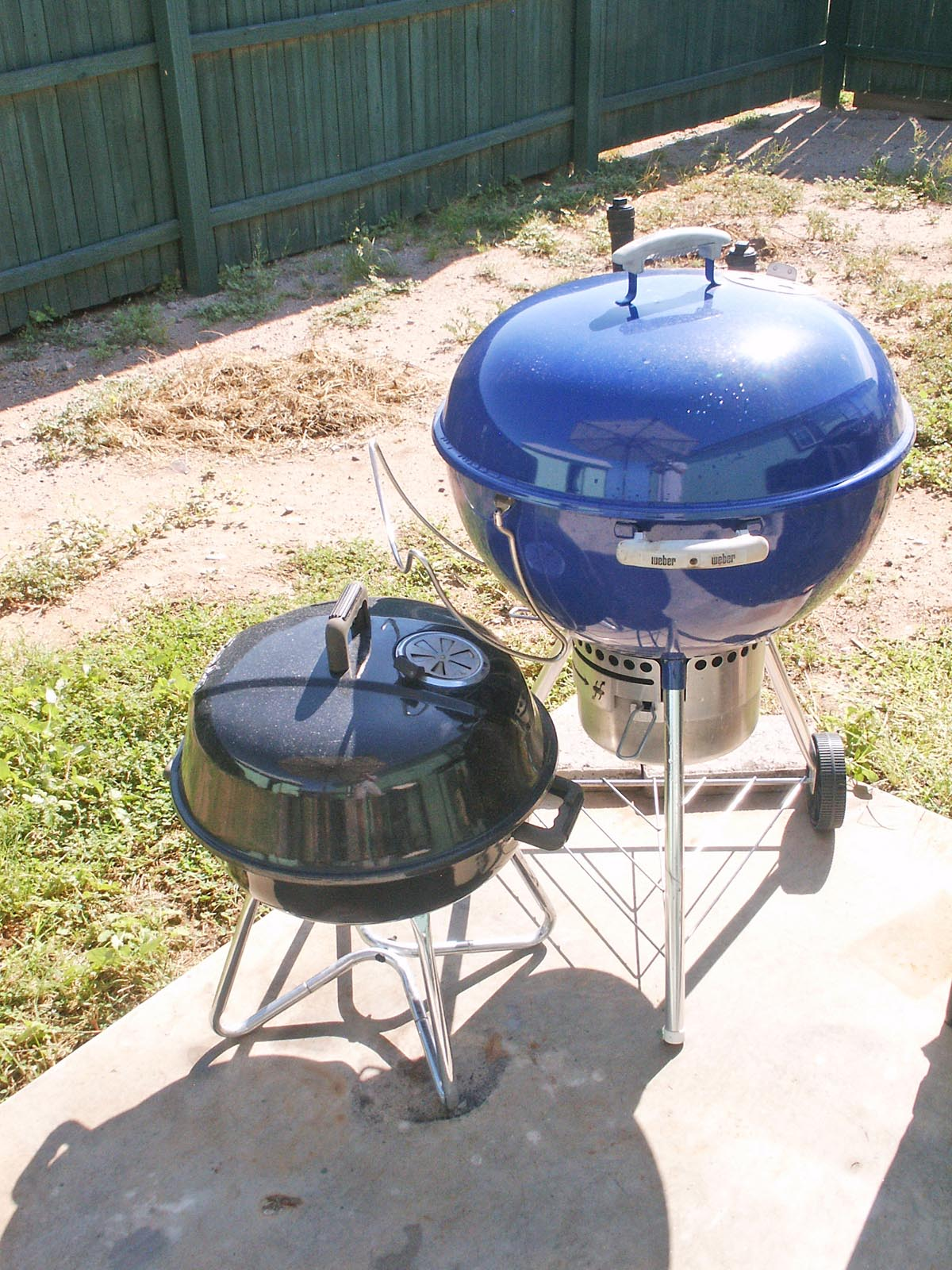
Two charcoal kettle grills, a small 18 inches (460 mm) tabletop model, and a freestanding 22.5 inches (570 mm) model

The kettle grill is considered the classic American grill design. The original and often-copied Weber kettle grill was invented in 1952 by George Stephen.

==== Ceramic cooker ====
The ceramic cooker design has been around for roughly 3,000 years. The shichirin, a Japanese grill traditionally of ceramic construction, has existed in its current form since the Edo period however more recent designs have been influenced by the mushikamado, a traditional Japanese cooking appliance, which gained recognition among Americans during World War II. Now, it is more commonly referred to as a kamado. The term "Kamado" is derived from the Japanese language and translates to "stove" or "cooking range." The ceramic cooker is more versatile than the kettle grill as the ceramic chamber retains heat and moisture more efficiently. Ceramic cookers are equally adept at grilling, smoking, and barbecuing foods.

==== Tandoor oven ====
A tandoor is used for cooking certain types of Iranian, Indian and Pakistani food, such as tandoori chicken and naan. In a tandoor, the wood fire is kept in the bottom of the oven and the food to be cooked is put on long skewers and inserted into the oven from an opening on the top so the meat items are above the coals of the fire. This method of cooking involves both grilling and oven cooking as the meat item to be cooked sees both high direct infrared heat and the heat of the air in the oven. Tandoor ovens often operate at temperatures above 500 °F (260 °C) and cook the meat items very quickly.

==== Portable charcoal ====
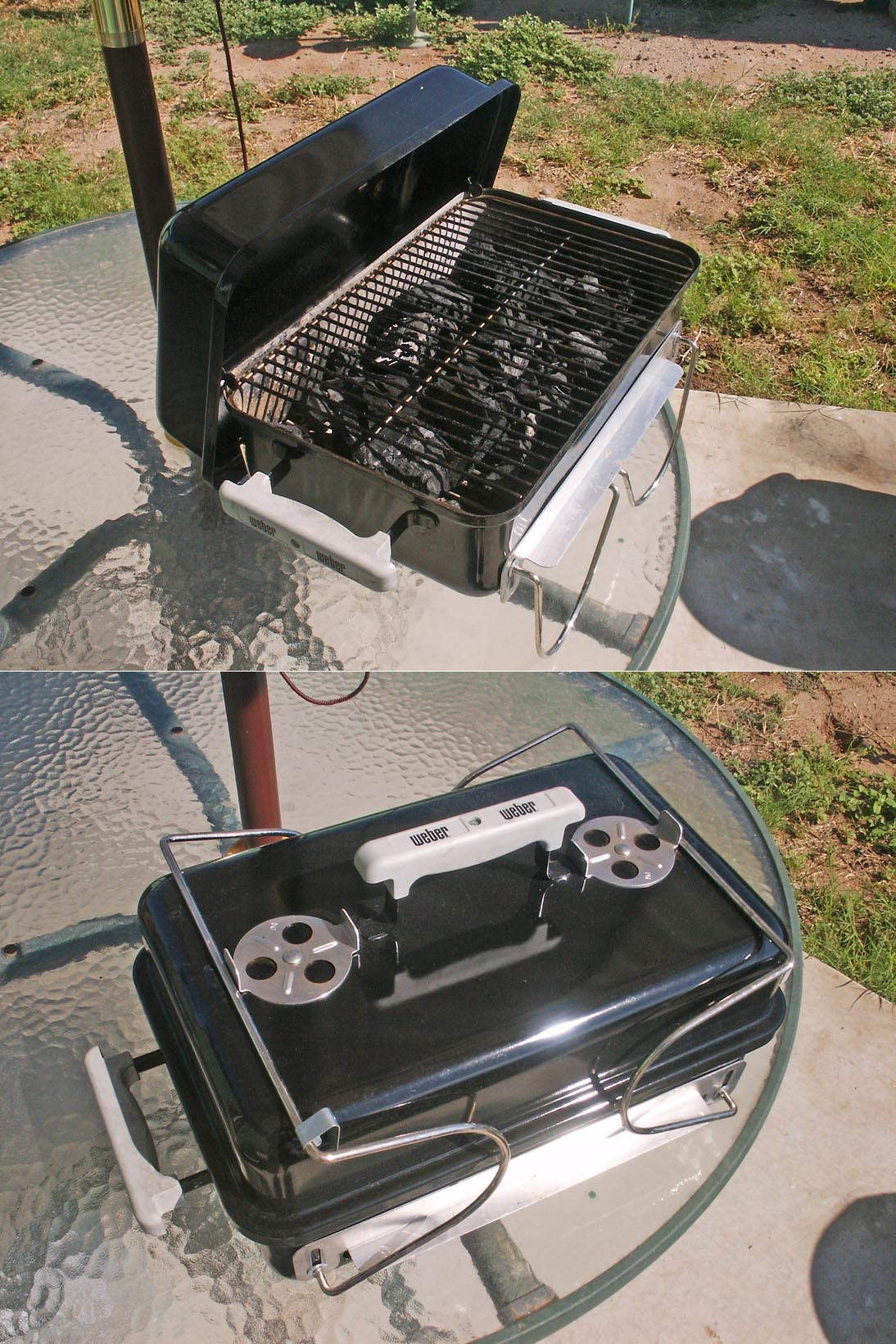
Portable charcoal grills are small but convenient for traveling, picnicking, and camping. This one is loaded with lump charcoal. The legs fold up and lock onto the lid so it can be carried by the lid handle.

The portable charcoal grill normally falls into either the brazier or kettle grill category. Some are rectangular in shape. A portable charcoal grill is usually quite compact and has features that make it easier to transport, making it a popular grill for tailgating. Often the legs fold up and lock into place so the grill will fit into a car trunk more easily. Most portable charcoal grills have venting, legs, and lids, though some models do not have lids (making them, technically, braziers). There are also grills designed without venting to prevent ash fallout for use in locations which ash may damage ground surfaces. Some portable grills are designed to replicate the function of a larger more traditional grill/brazier and may include spit roasting as well as a hood and additional grill areas under the hood area.

==== Gravity-fed ====
Gravity-fed charcoal grills have a hopper that is filled with charcoal briquettes or lump charcoal; then a fire is lit at the bottom of the hopper. A digitally controlled fan is used to control the intensity and temperature of the fire burning. The heat and smoke is routed underneath the food to cook and smoke it.

=== Commercial ===
A commercial barbecue typically has a larger cooking capacity than traditional household grills, as well as featuring a variety of accessories for added versatility. End users of commercial barbecue grills include for-profit operations such as restaurants, caterers, food vendors and grilling operations at food fairs, golf tournaments and other charity events, as well as competition cookers. The category lends itself to originality, and many commercial barbecue grills feature designs unique to their respective manufacturer.

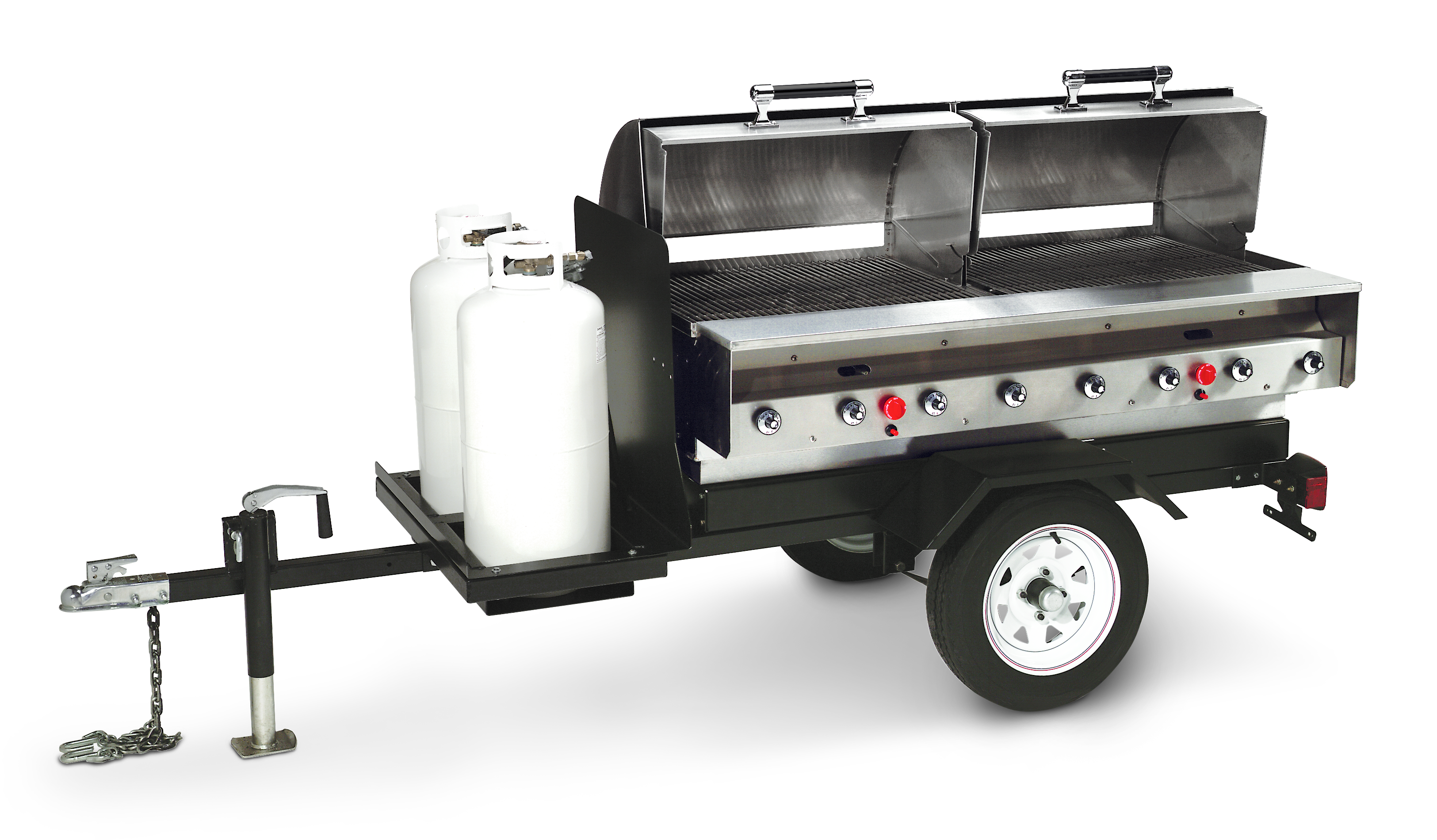
Model Mobile-SLPX Commercial Barbecue Grill

Commercial barbecue grills can be stationary or transportable. An example of a stationary grill is a built-in pit grill, for indoor or outdoor use. Construction materials include bricks, mortar, concrete, tile and cast iron. Most commercial barbecue grills, however, are mobile, allowing the operator to take the grill wherever the job is. Transportable commercial barbecue grills can be units with removable legs, grills that fold, and grills mounted entirely on trailers.

Trailer mounted commercial barbecue grills run the gamut from basic grill cook tops to pit barbecue grills and smokers, to specialized roasting units that cook whole pigs, chicken, ribs, corn and other vegetables.

== Parts ==
Many gas grill components can be replaced with new parts, adding to the useful life of the grill. Though charcoal grills can sometimes require new cooking grids and charcoal grates, gas grills are much more complex, and require additional components such as burners, valves, and heat shields.

=== Burners ===
A gas grill burner is the central source of heat for cooking food. Gas grill burners are typically constructed of: stainless steel, aluminized steel, or cast iron, occasionally porcelain-coated.

Burners are hollow with gas inlet holes and outlet 'ports'. For each inlet there is a separate control on the control panel of the grill. The most common type of gas grill burners are called 'H' burners and resemble the capital letter 'H' turned on its side. Another popular shape is oval. There are also 'Figure 8', 'Bowtie' and 'Bar' burners. Other grills have a separate burner for each control. These burners can be referred to as 'Pipe', 'Tube', or 'Rail' burners. They are mostly straight since they are only required to heat one portion of the grill.

Gas is mixed with air in venturi tubes or simply 'venturis'. Venturis can be permanently attached to the burner or removable. At the other end of the venturi is the gas valve, which is connected to the control knob on the front of the grill.

A metal screen covers the fresh air intake of each venturi to keep spiders from clogging the tube with their nests.

=== Cooking grate ===
Cooking grates, also known as cooking grids, are the surface on which the food is cooked in a grill. They are typically made of:

- Stainless steel - usually the most expensive and longest-lasting option, may carry a lifetime warranty
- Porcelain-coated cast iron - the next best option after stainless steel, usually thick and good for searing meat
- Porcelain-coated steel - will typically last as long as porcelain-coated cast iron, but not as good for searing
- Cast iron - more commonly used for charcoal grills, cast iron must be coated with cooking oil between uses to protect it from rusting
- Chrome-plated steel - usually the least expensive and shortest-lasting material

Cooking grates used over gas or charcoal barbecues will allow fat and oil to drop between the grill bars. This can cause the fat or oil to ignite in a 'flare-up', the flames from which can blacken or burn the food on the grate. In an attempt to combat this problem, some barbecues are fitted with plates, baffles or other means to deflect the dripping flammable fluids away from the burners.

=== Rock grate ===
Rock grates are placed directly above the burner and are designed to hold lava rock or ceramic briquettes. These materials serve a dual purpose - they protect the burner from drippings which can accelerate the deterioration of the burner, and they disperse the heat from the burner more evenly throughout the grill.

=== Heat shield ===
Heat shields are also known as burner shields, heat plates, heat tents, radiation shields, or heat angles. They serve the same purpose as a rock grate and rock, protecting the burner from corrosive meat drippings and dispersing heat. They are more common in newer grills. Heat shields are lighter, easier to replace and harbor less bacteria than rocks.

Like lava rock or ceramic briquettes, heat shields also vaporize the meat drippings and 'infuse' the meat with more flavor.

=== Valves ===
Valves can wear out or become rusted and too difficult to operate requiring replacement. A valve is unlike a burner, a replacement valve usually must be an exact match to the original in order to fit properly. As a consequence, many grills are disposed of when valves fail due to a lack of available replacements.

If a valve seems to be moving properly, but no gas is getting to the burner, the most common cause for this is debris in the venturi. This impediment can be cleared by using a long flexible object.

=== Cover ===
A barbecue cover is a textile product specially designed to fit over a grill so as to protect it from outdoor elements such as sun, wind, rain and snow, and outdoor contaminants such as dust, pollution, and bird droppings.

Barbecue covers are commonly made with a vinyl outer shell and a heat-resistant inner lining, as well as adjustable straps to secure the cover in windy conditions. The cover may have a polyester surface, often with polyurethane coating on the outer surface, with polyvinyl chloride liner.

== See also ==
- Asado
- Barbecue
- Brazier
- Brustolina
- Charcoal
- Churrasco
- Fire basket
- Gridiron
- Grilling
- Hearth
- Hibachi
- Kitchen stove
- List of cooking appliances
- Manghal (barbecue)
- Piezo ignition
- Roasting
- Rotisserie
- Schwenker
- Shichirin
