= Shichirin =

Small Japanese charcoal grill

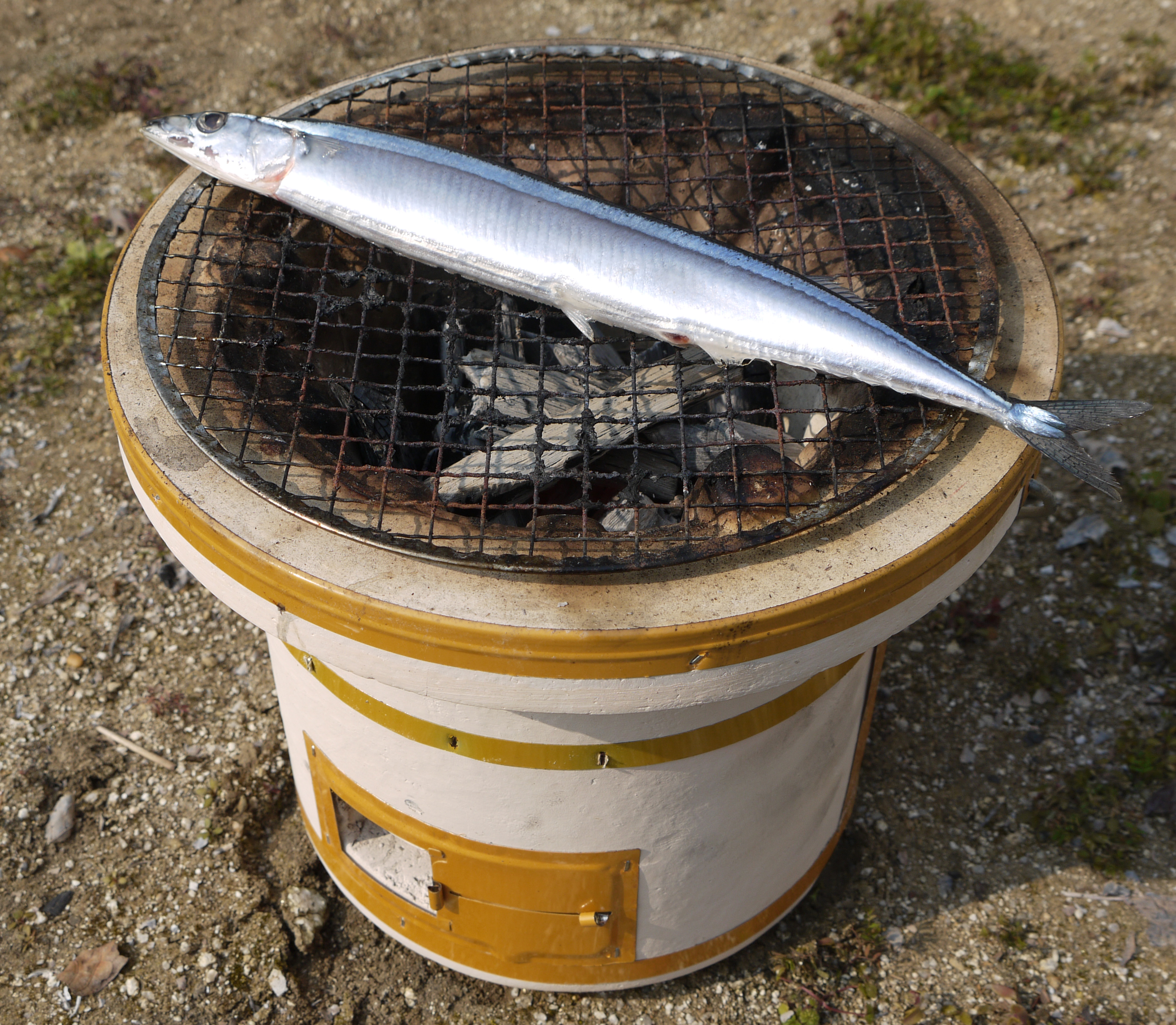
Shichirin grill with Pacific saury (sanma)

Shichirin (Japanese: 七輪, literally "seven wheels") is a small Japanese charcoal grill.

== Etymology ==
Shichirin being a compound word made up of the characters 七 (shichi or nana, "seven") and 輪 (rin or wa, "wheel", "loop", or "ring"), its coinage can be suggested through the individual kanji. A popular story links the "rin" of shichirin to the Edo period currency denomination, the one-rin coin (albeit a different character, 厘). It is said that the shichirin was an affordable way to cook a meal because the amount of charcoal needed for each lighting only cost seven rin.

== Description ==
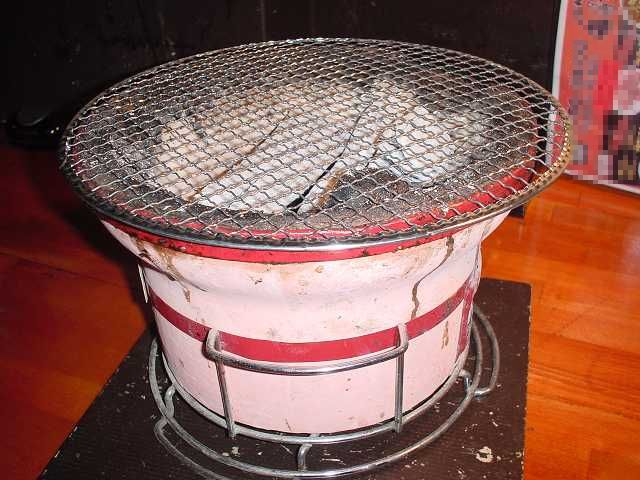
A basic shichirin

The shichirin is a lightweight, compact, and easy-to-move cooking stove. Most modern shichirin are produced from rigid blocks of diatomaceous earth mined from deposits. These blocks of earth were then carved by hand or turned by machine before being fired in a kiln and affixed with metal hardware. Some shichirin are made with a double inside and outside ceramic structure.

Charcoal is chiefly used for the fuel. Shichirin are said to be made in roughly the same way today as in the Edo period, though both ceramic and diatomaceous earth versions were common. The shape is mainly cylindrical, square, or rectangular, and the size also varies. In the Kansai region, they are also known as kanteki.

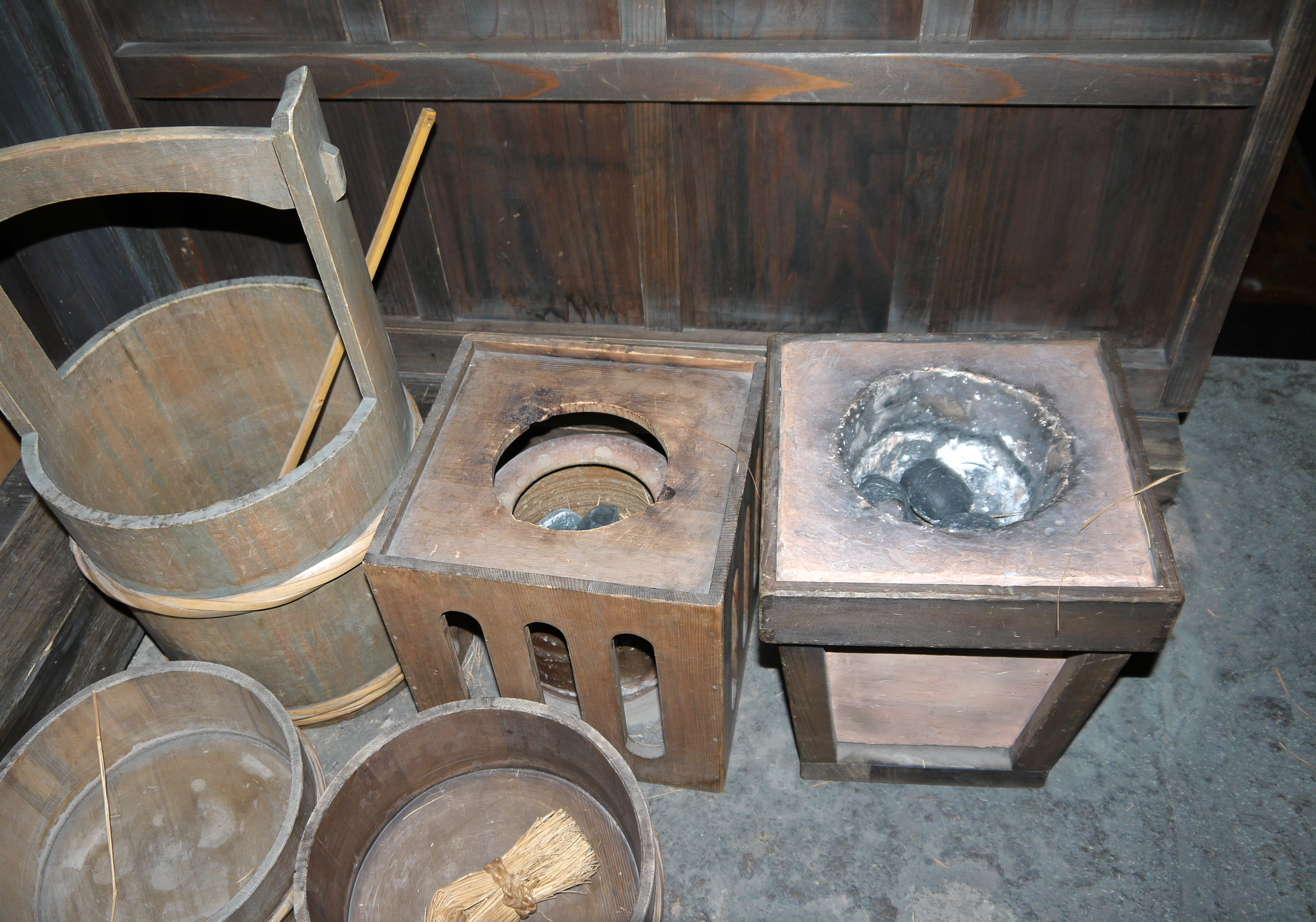
A shichirin of the Edo period

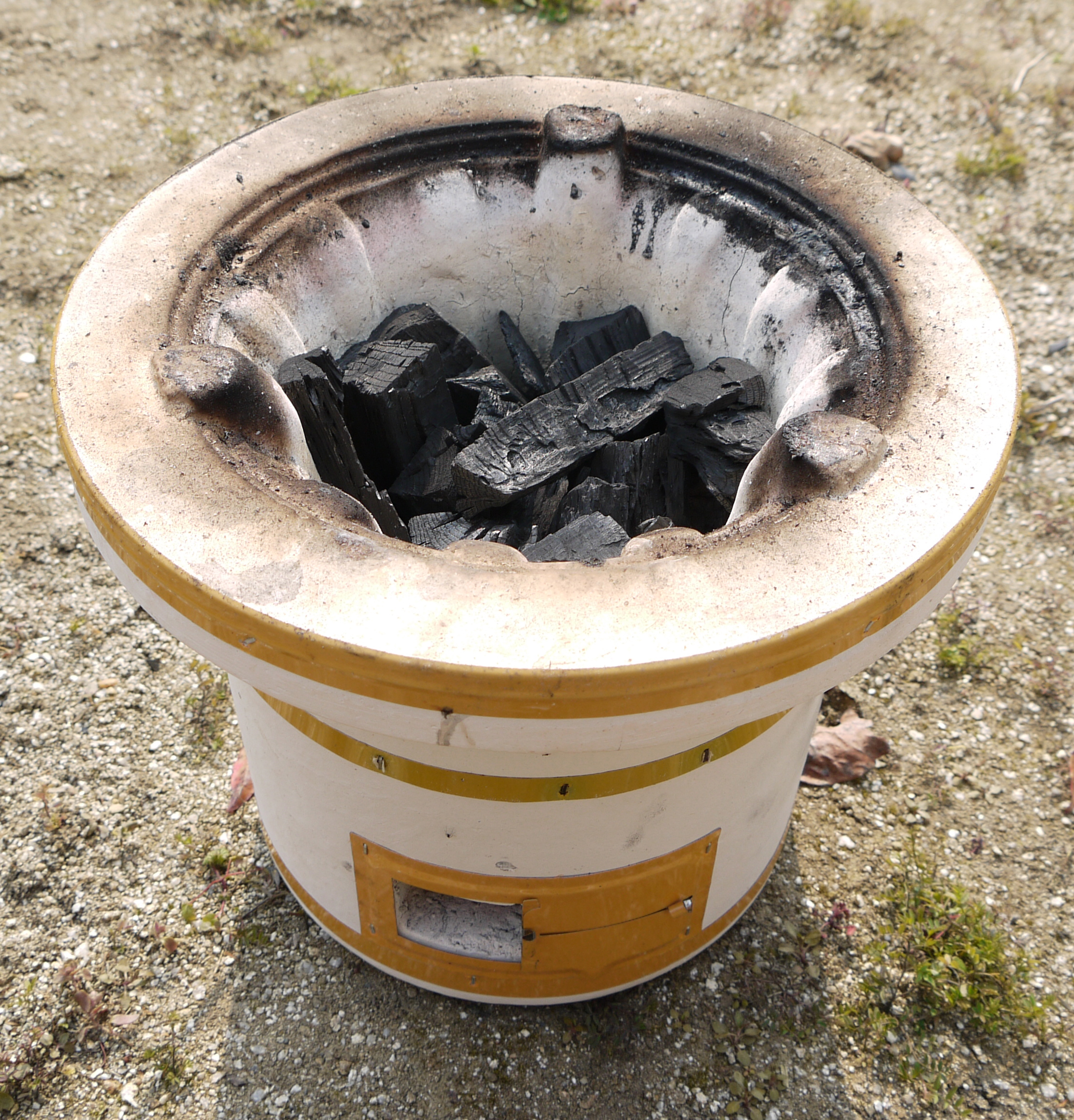
With charcoal

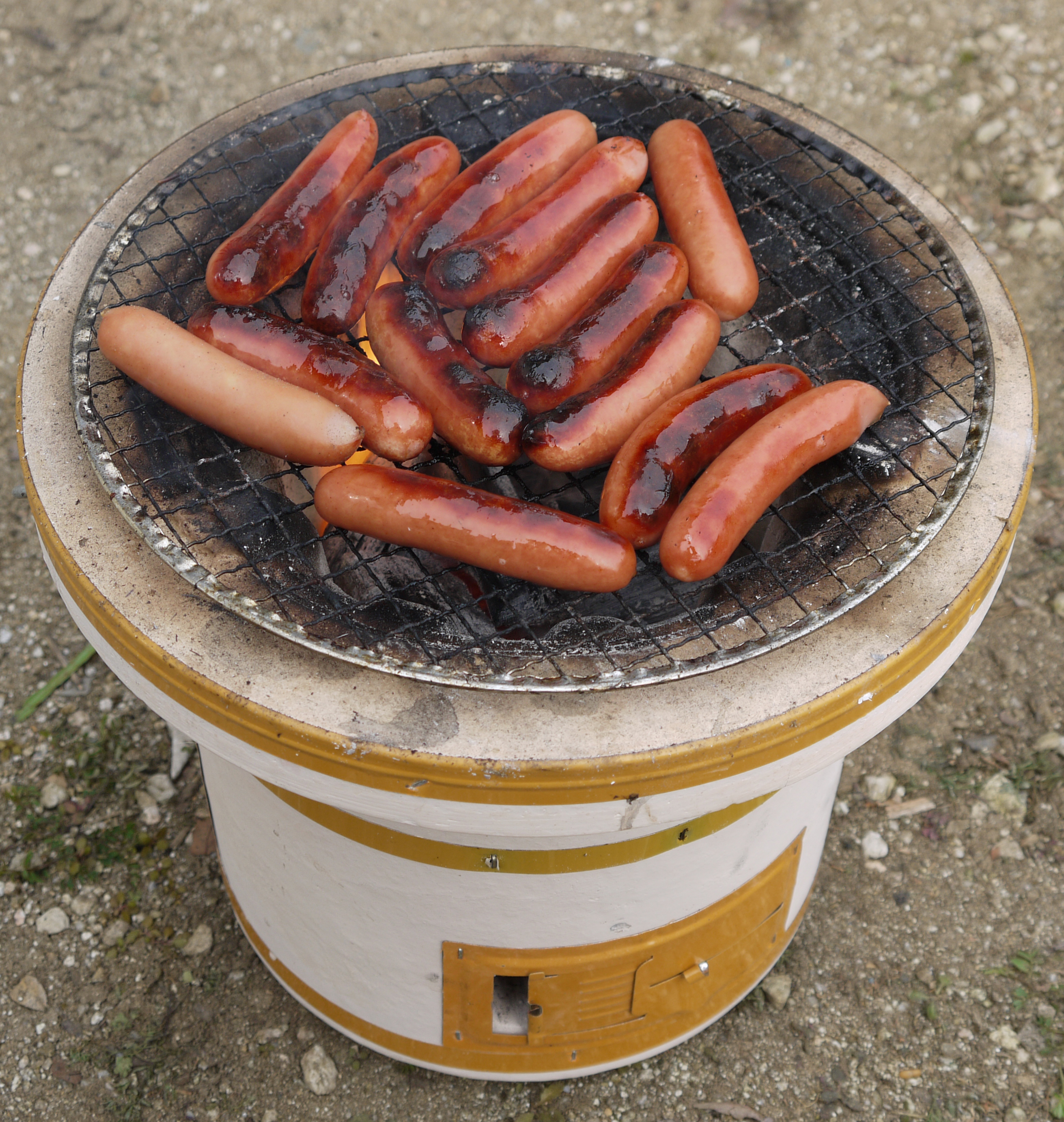
Grilling sausages

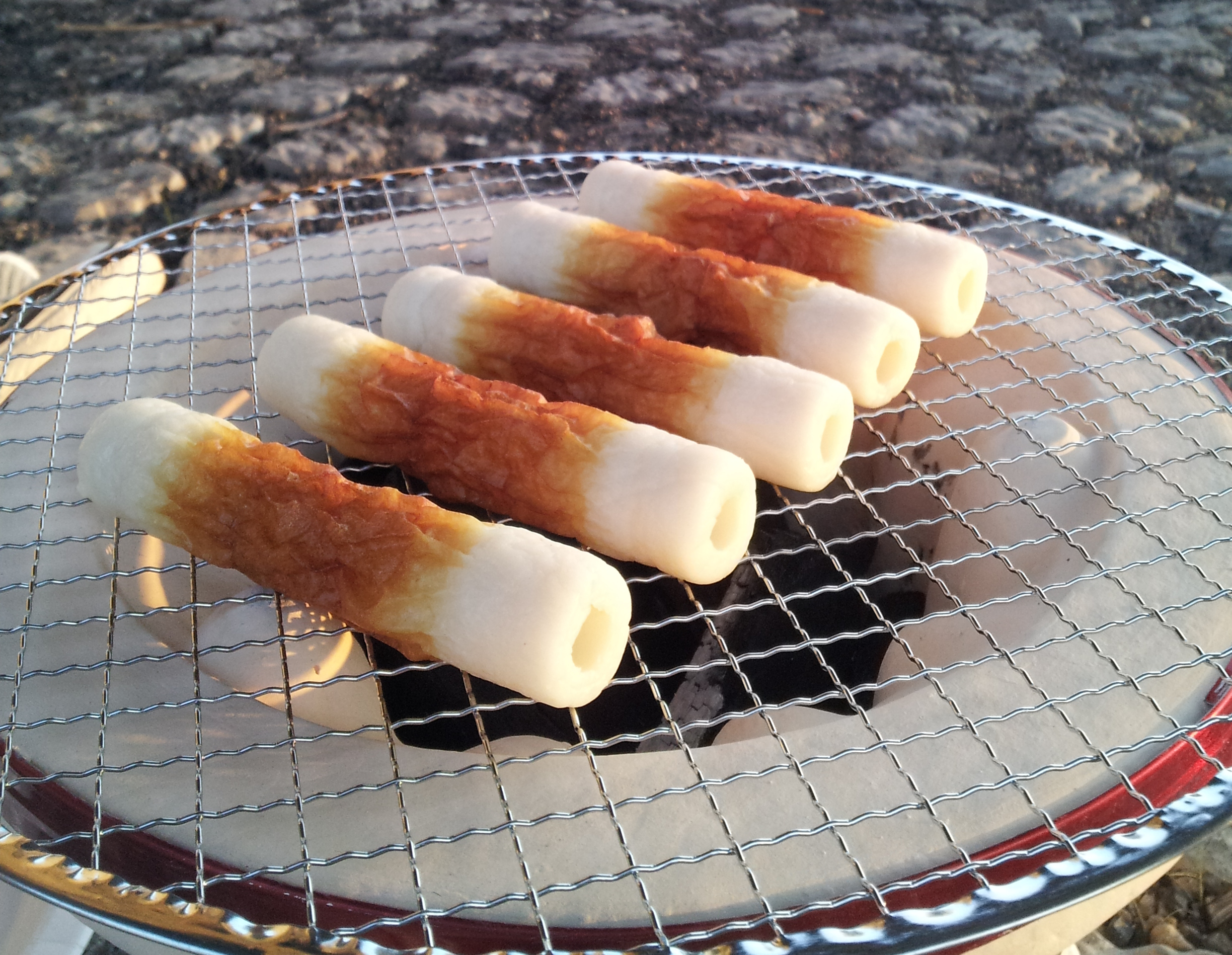
Grilling chikuwa

== Use ==
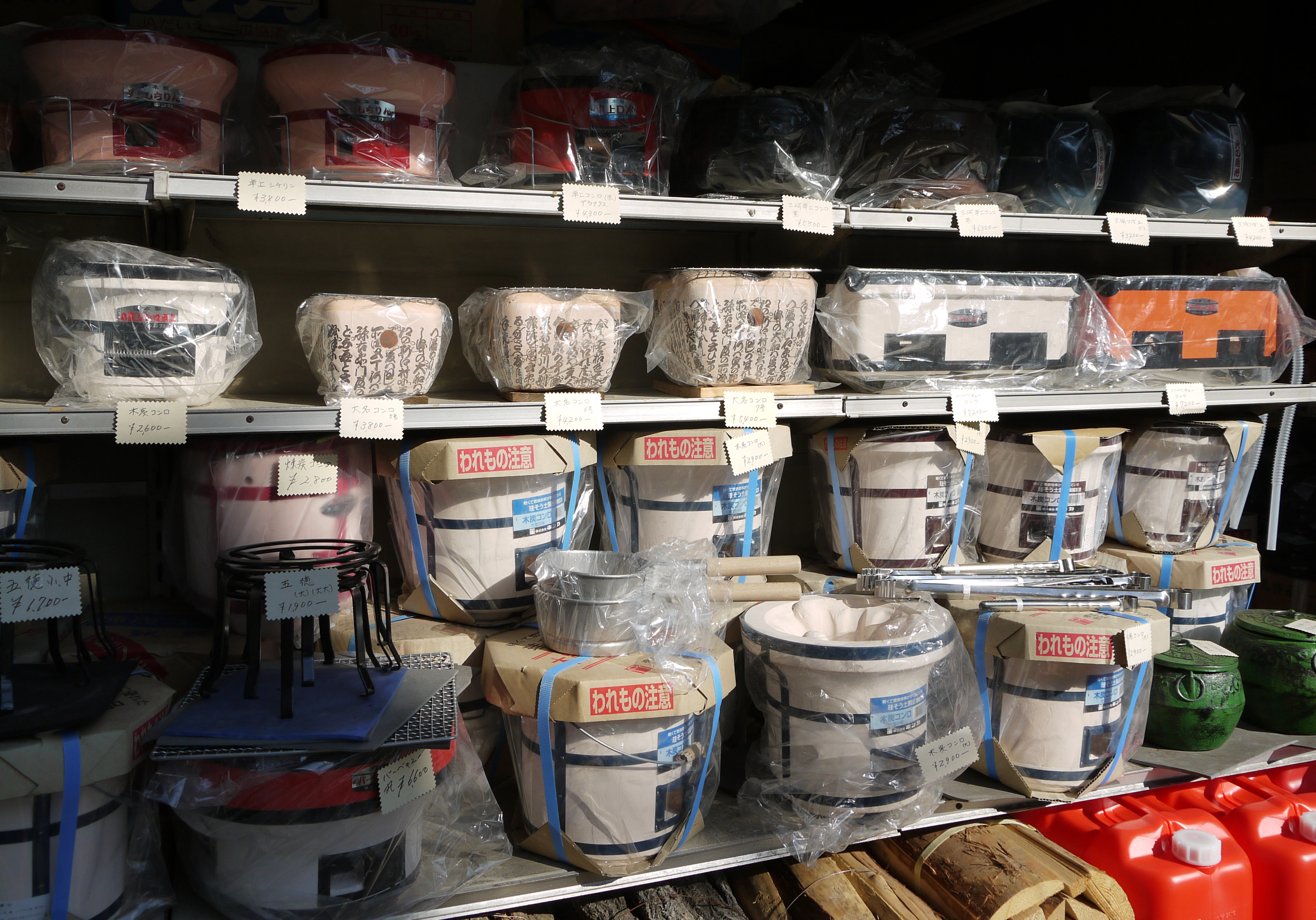
Various shichirin sold in Tokyo

Charcoal is commonly used as a fuel for a shichirin. For outdoor cooking, black charcoal is used. When indoors, binchōtan is preferred. Binchōtan, a type of white charcoal, produces less of a smell when burned, can continue burning hotly for a longer time, and is less likely to flare up dangerously. As a cheaper alternative, sawdust charcoal may be used.

== North American "hibachi" ==
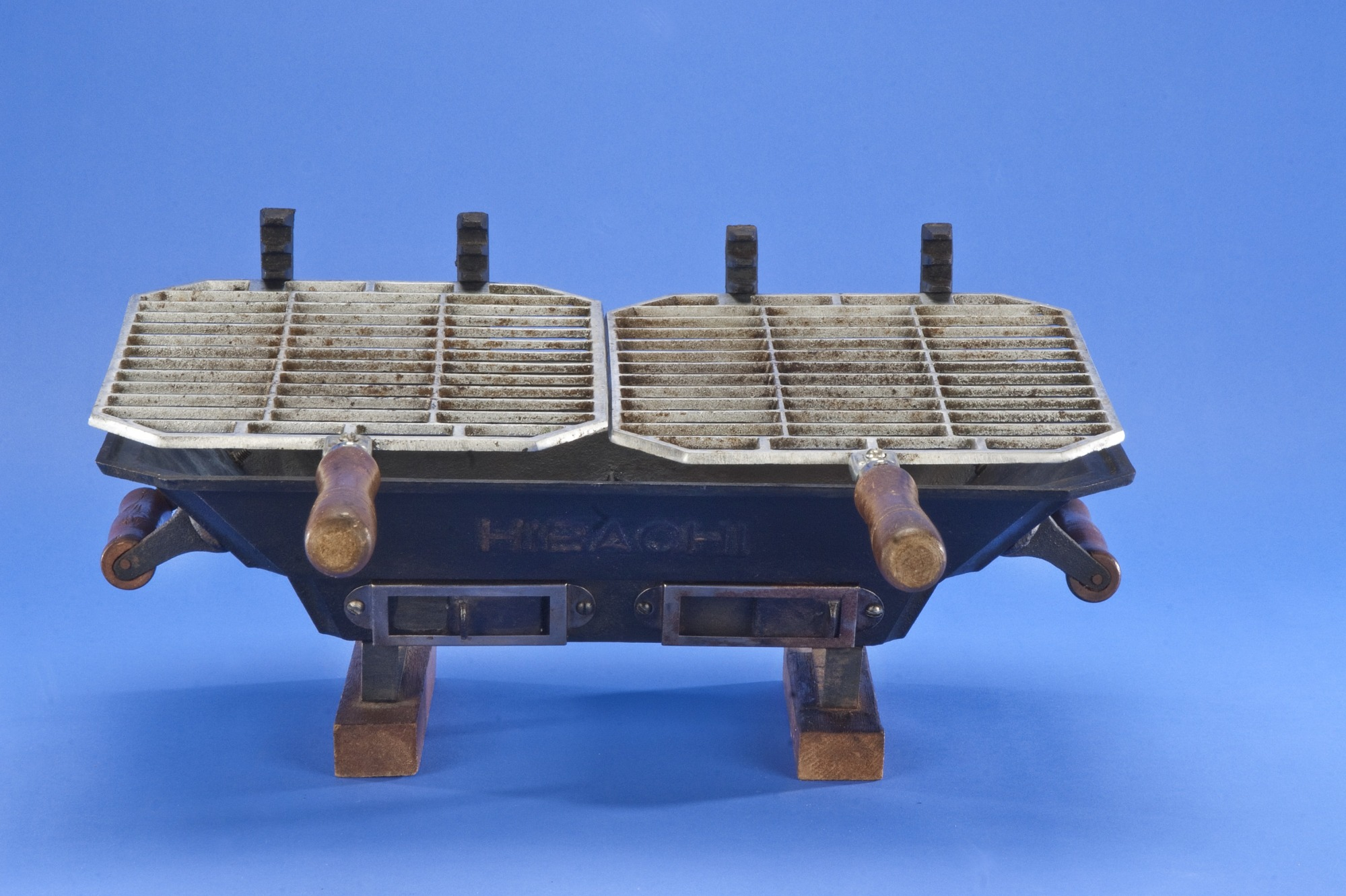
North American "Hibachi" cast iron grill

In North America, small BBQ cooking stoves resembling shichirin are referred to as "hibachi" or "hibachi-style", which in Japanese refers to a small heating device which is not usually used for cooking. It has been suggested that these grills were confusingly marketed as "hibachi" when they were introduced to North America. The word "hibachi" is also (incorrectly) used in some parts of the United States to refer to Japanese steak houses or teppanyaki "iron hot plate" restaurants.

== See also ==
- List of stoves
