= George A. Stephen =

American businessman (1921–1993)

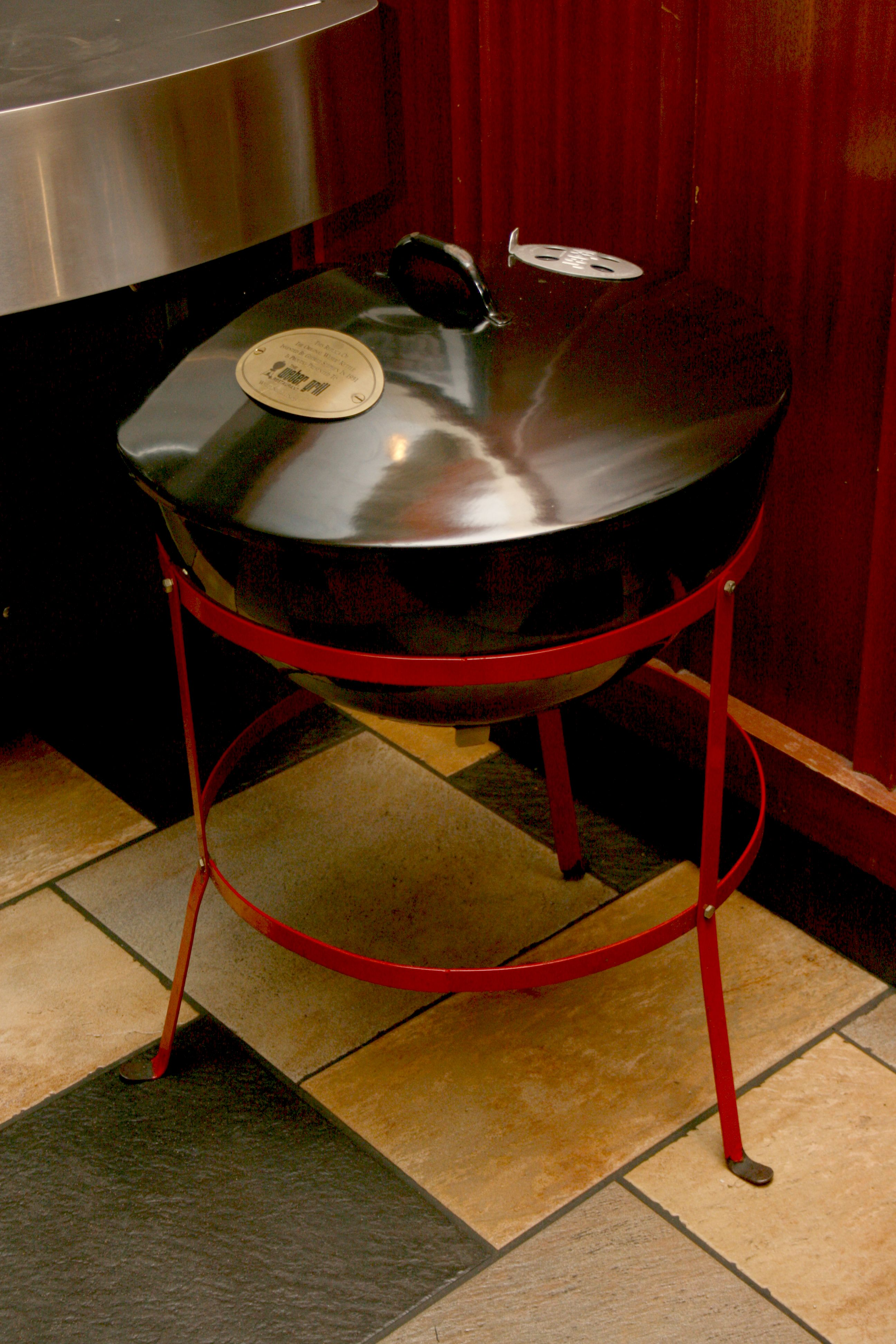
Replica of the original 1951 Weber kettle grill

George A. Stephen Sr. (February 26, 1921 – February 11, 1993) was an American inventor, entrepreneur, and the founder of Weber-Stephen Products Co., the company best known for the manufacturing of charcoal and gas grills. Stephen is credited with the invention of the Weber Kettle grill by cutting a metal buoy in half and fashioning a dome shaped grill with a rounded lid, which he began selling in 1952.
