= Weber Inc. =

American manufacturer of charcoal, gas, and electric outdoor grills

Weber, Inc.

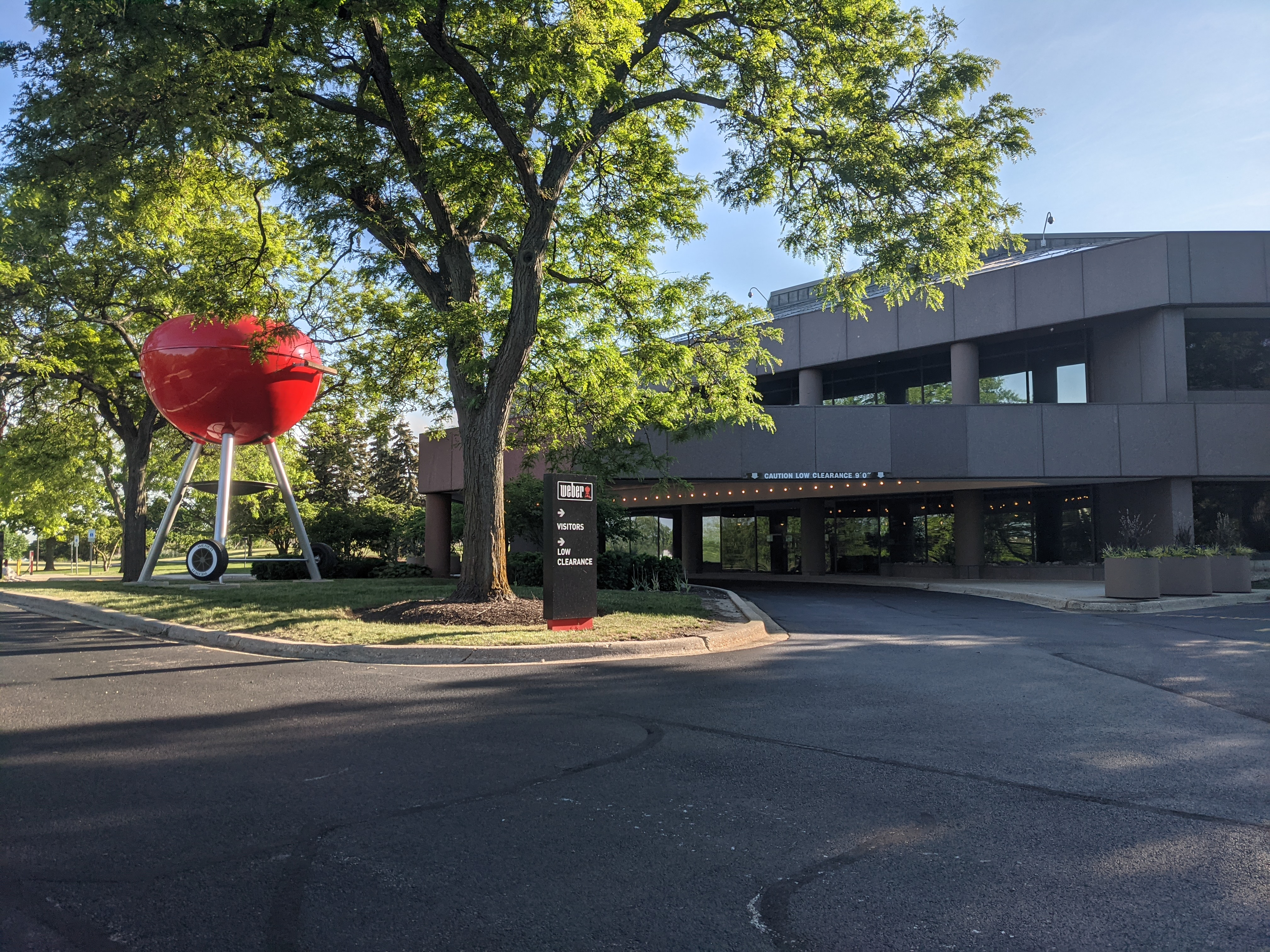
- Weber-Stephen Products' headquarters in Palatine, Illinois
- Type: Private
- Traded as: NYSE: WEBR (2021-2023)
- ISIN: US94770D1028
- Industry: Manufacturing
- Founded: May 8, 1893
- Founder: George A. Stephen
- Headquarters: Palatine, Illinois
- Key people: Alan Matula (Interim CEO)
- Products: Outdoor grills
- Net income: US$88.88 million (2020)
- Website: www.weber.com

Weber Inc. is an American manufacturer of charcoal, gas, and electric outdoor grills with related accessories. It also owns restaurants and publishes cookbooks.

The company was family owned until it sold a majority stake to BDT Capital Partners in 2010. In 2021, it became a publicly traded company until it was taken private by BDT Capital Partners which purchased all remaining out-standing stock in 2023.

== History ==
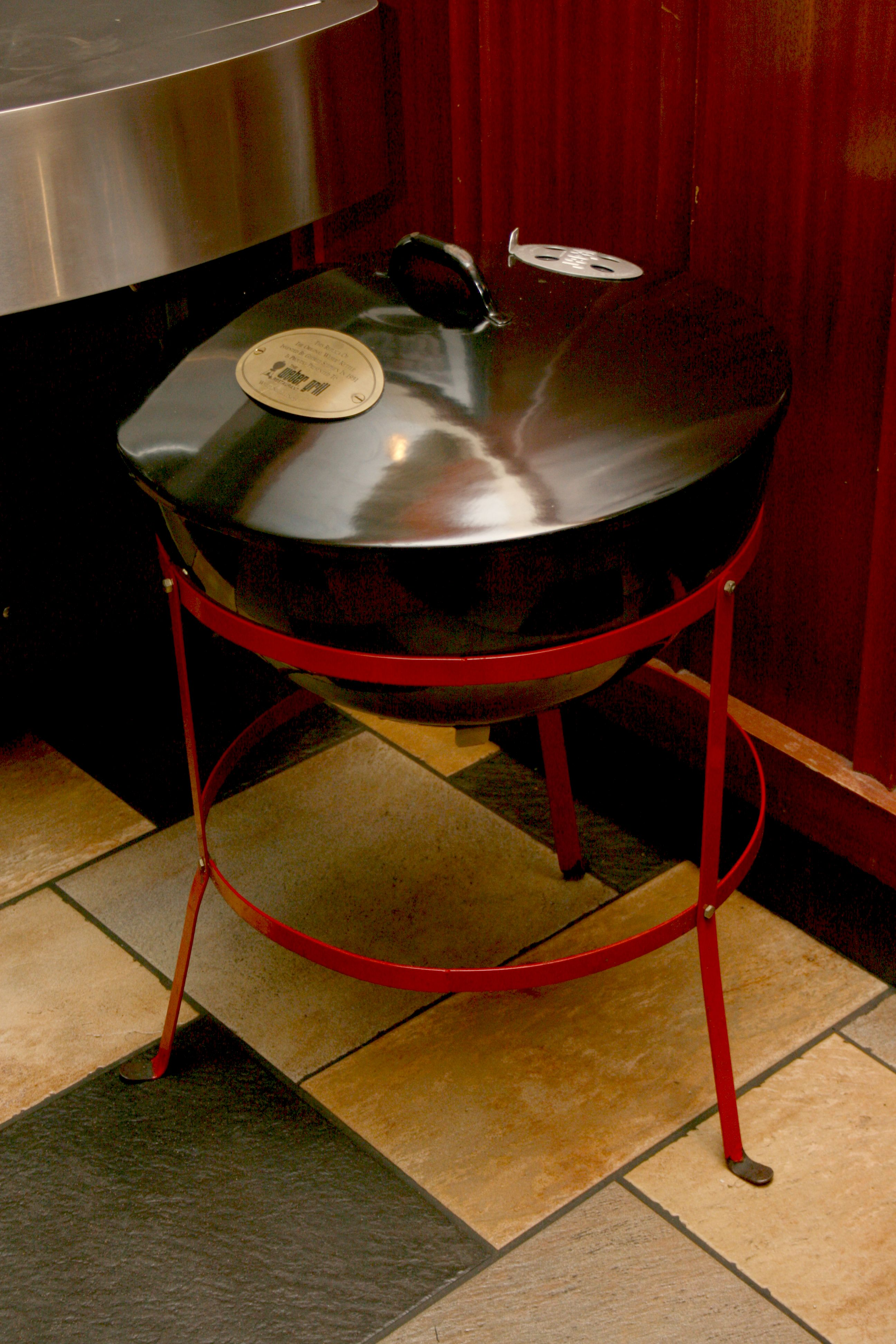
Replica of the original 1951 Weber kettle grill

Weber-Stephen was originally incorporated on May 8, 1893, as Weber Bros. Metal Works.

In 1951, the original round charcoal kettle grill was built by George Stephen Sr., a then part-owner of the sheet metal shop in Chicago who sought to improve on the brazier he had been using to cook with at home. The grill was produced using two sheet metal half-spheres normally used as parts of buoys built in his shop. Shortly thereafter he began selling the invention, which he called 'George's Barbecue Kettle', for which there was considerable demand.

One of the earlier nicknames for the grill was ‘Sputnik‘.

Because the grill became so successful after he began selling it in 1952, Stephen formed the barbecue division of the Weber Brothers factory. In the late 1950s, Stephen bought out the Weber Brothers factory and became the sole owner, devoting all his professional time to manufacturing and selling the Weber kettle. Soon thereafter, Stephen changed the company's name to Weber-Stephen Products Co.

The Weber-Stephen company manufactures and sells outdoor electric grills, charcoal grills, gas grills, and charcoal smokers.

== Weber Grill restaurants ==
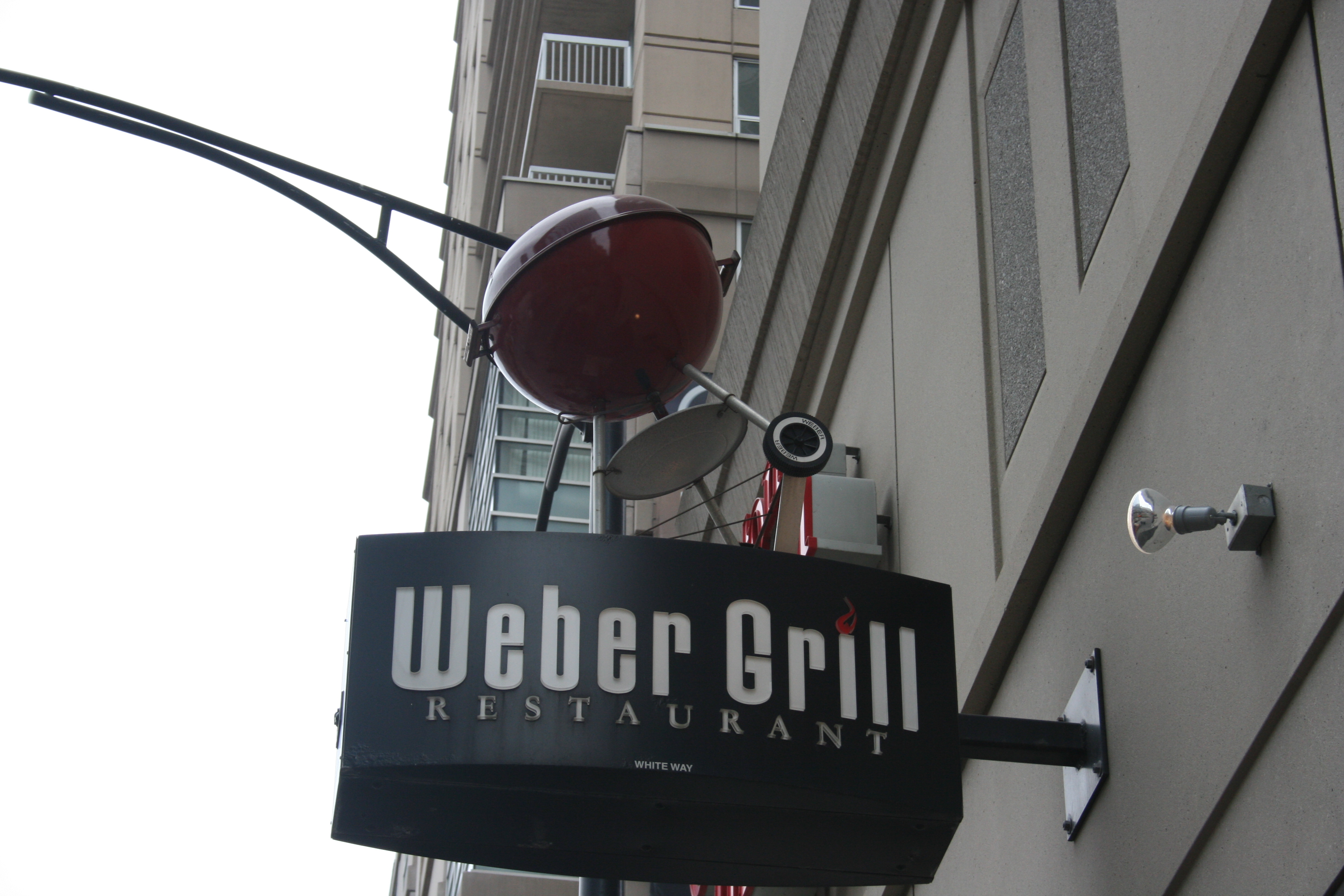
Weber Grill Restaurant in Chicago, Illinois

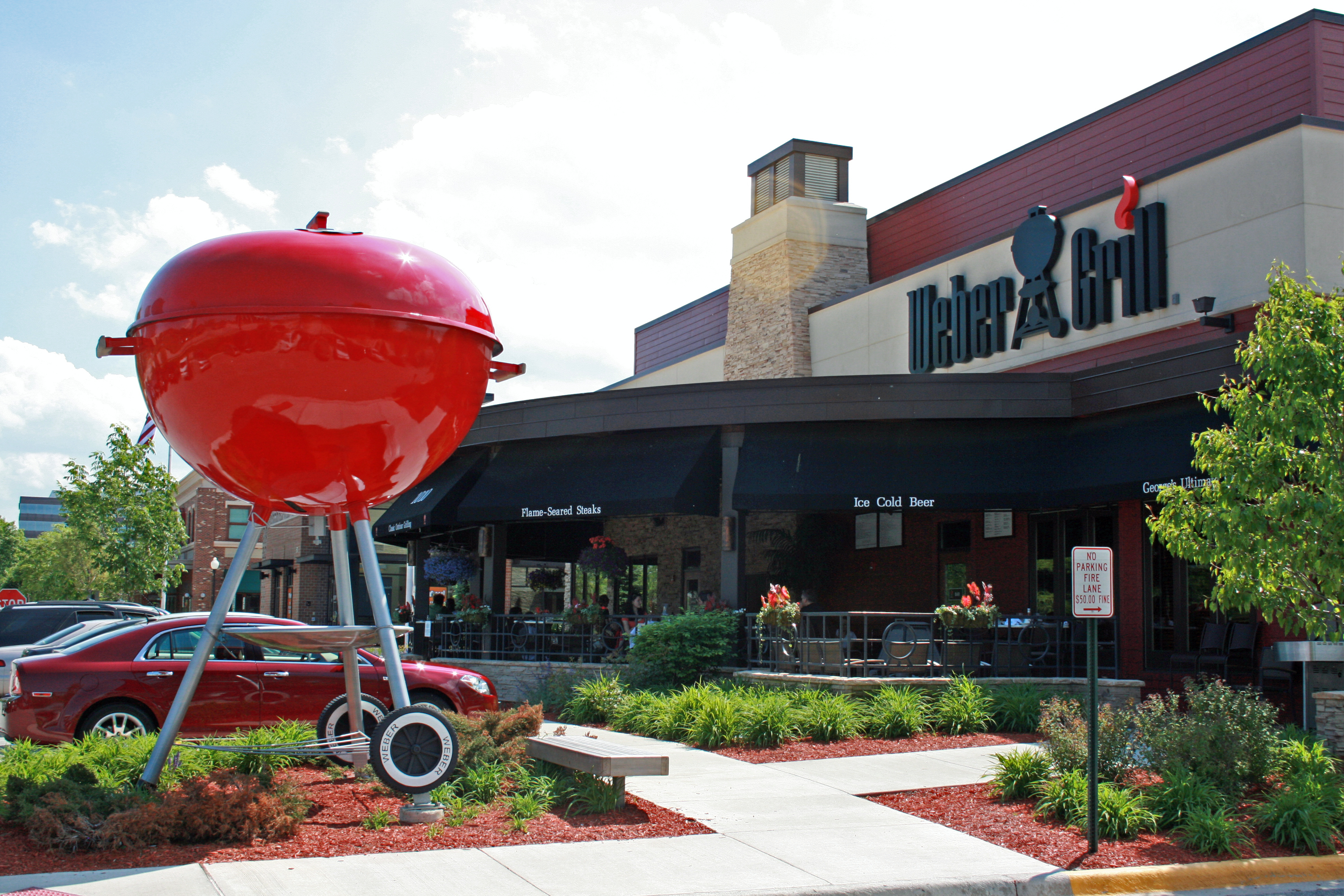
Weber Grill Restaurant in Schaumburg, Illinois

In 1989, the company opened the first Weber Grill Restaurant in Wheeling, Illinois, but in spite of a remodeling in 2000, this location closed in 2010. As of August 2021, four additional locations are open in Lombard, Illinois (opened 1999), River North, Chicago (2002), Schaumburg, Illinois (2005), and Indianapolis (2007).

While a majority share of Weber-Stephen Products LLC was sold to BDT Capital Partners in 2010, the acquisition did not include restaurant operations. While both the restaurants and outdoor cooking equipment maintain the Weber branding, two separate companies now exist. The restaurants remain solely owned by the Stephen family.

On December 12, 2022, Weber announced that BDT Capital Partners purchased all of Weber's remaining stock, representing a total enterprise value of $3.7 billion. Weber's stock was then suspended and then delisted on the New York Stock Exchange.

== Acquisitions ==
=== Ducane Products Co. ===
The Ducane Products Company began as the Ducane Brothers Metal Fabricating in 1946. It moved three years later to Little Ferry, New Jersey and manufactured warm air furnaces. In 1968, the name was changed to The Ducane Company and moved the base of operations to Barnwell, South Carolina and in 1975, they started making Ducane gas grills. Ducane filed for bankruptcy in 2003 and was partially acquired by Weber-Stephens at a bankruptcy sale in 2004 for $13.6 million.

Under Weber's leadership, Ducane marketed propane and natural gas grills through big box home improvement and specialty outdoor product stores. In an effort to revamp the Ducane brand, Weber introduced the "Ducane Stainless" (2006) exclusively through Home Depot, the "Ducane Affinity" (2007) and the "Ducane Meridian" (2007) through multiple channels.

=== June ===
In 2021, it was announced that June, a home automation company specializing in kitchen appliances including a "smart" oven, was acquired by Weber for $142.2 million. It exists as a “strategic business unit” within Weber. Co-founder Matt Van Horn is the president of June while the company's other co-founder, Nikhil Bhogal, is the senior vice president, technology and connected devices of Weber. Van Horn continued to focus on the June Oven while Bhogal works with Weber R&D programs and new products.

== Initial public offering ==
On July 12, 2021, Weber-Stephens Products LLC announced it had filed a Form S-1 with the Securities and Exchange Commission to make a public offering of Class A Shares on the New York Stock Exchange with an expected ticker symbol WEBR. It began trading under symbol WEBR on August 5, 2021, opening at $17 per share compared to the IPO offering of $14 per share.

== Publications ==
- Weber's Art of the Grill: Recipes for Outdoor Living, Jamie Purviance and Tim Turner, ISBN 978-0-8118-2419-4, 1999.
- Weber's Big Book of Grilling, Jamie Purviance, Sandra S. McRae, and Tim Turner, ISBN 978-0-8118-3197-0, 2001.
- Weber's Art of the Grill Deck: Recipes for Outdoor Living (cards), Jamie Purviance and Tim Turner, ISBN 978-0-8118-3336-3, 2002.
- Weber's Real Grilling, Jamie Purviance, Mike Kempster, and Tim Turner, ISBN 978-0-376-02046-8, 2005.
- Weber's Charcoal Grilling: The Art of Cooking With Live Fire, Jamie Purviance and Tim Turner, ISBN 978-0-376-02047-5, 2007.
- Weber's Way to Grill: The Step-by-Step Guide to Expert Grilling, Jamie Purviance, ISBN 978-0-376-02059-8, 2009.
- Weber's Complete Barbecue Book: Step-by-step Advice and Over 150 Delicious Barbecue Recipes, Jamie Purviance, ISBN 978-0600621119, 2010.
- Weber's On the Grill: Chicken & Sides: Over 100 Fresh, Great Tasting Recipes, Jamie Purviance, ISBN 978-0376020352, 2010.
- Weber's On the Grill: Steak & Sides: Over 100 Fresh, Great Tasting Recipes, Jamie Purviance, ISBN 978-0376020338, 2010.
- Weber's Time to Grill: Get In. Get Out. Get Grilling., Jamie Purviance, ISBN 978-0376020604, 2011.
- Weber's Smoke: A Guide to Smoke Cooking for Everyone and Any Grill, Jamie Purviance, ISBN 978-0376020673, 2012.
- Weber's Barbecue Anytime: Over 190 Inspirational Recipes to Help You Get the Most Out of Your Barbecue, Jamie Purviance, ISBN 978-0600624134, 2012.
- Weber's New Real Grilling: The ultimate cookbook for every backyard griller, Jamie Purviance, ISBN 978-0376027986, 2013.
