= Hibachi =

Japanese heating device

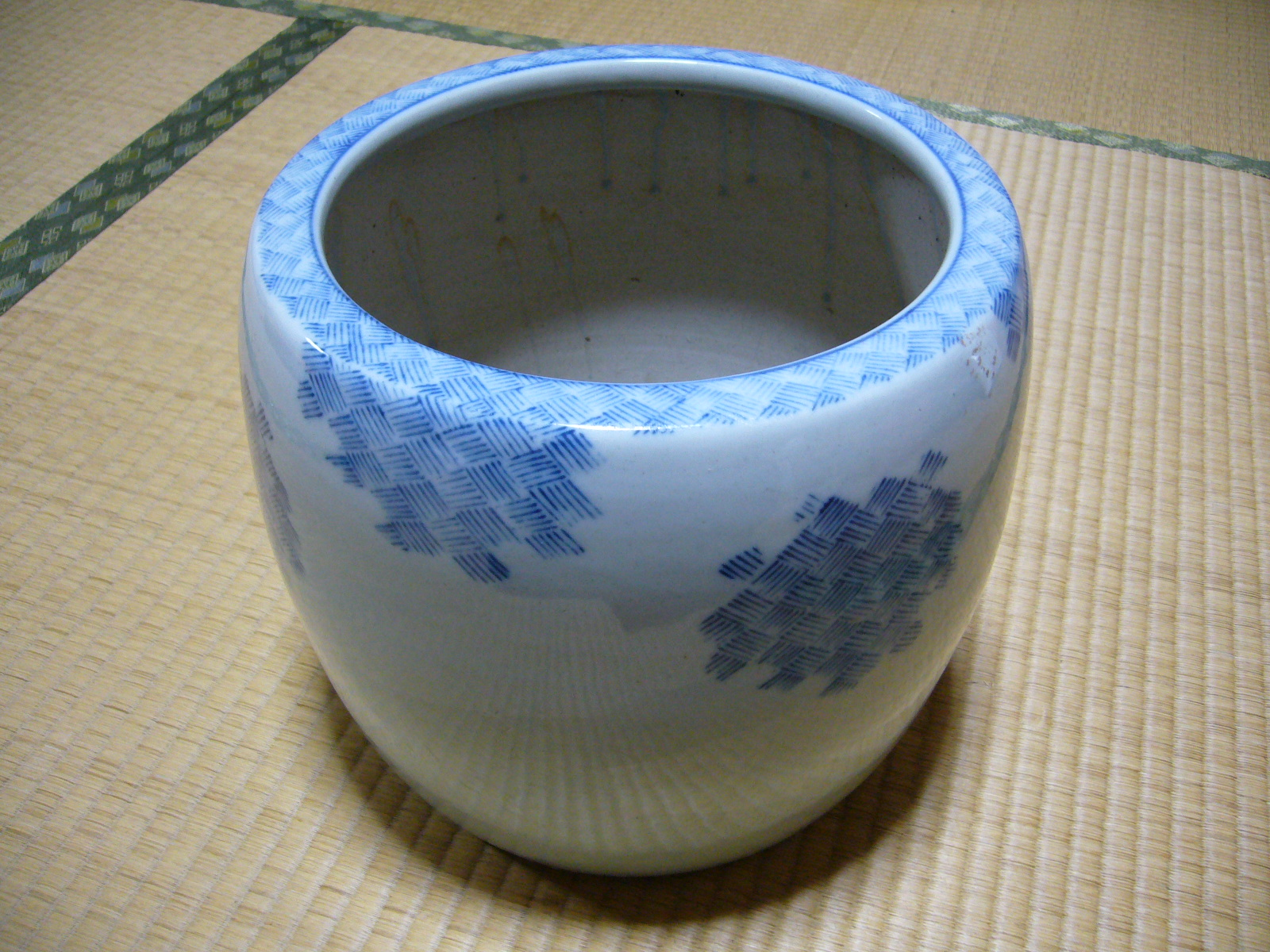
A porcelain hibachi

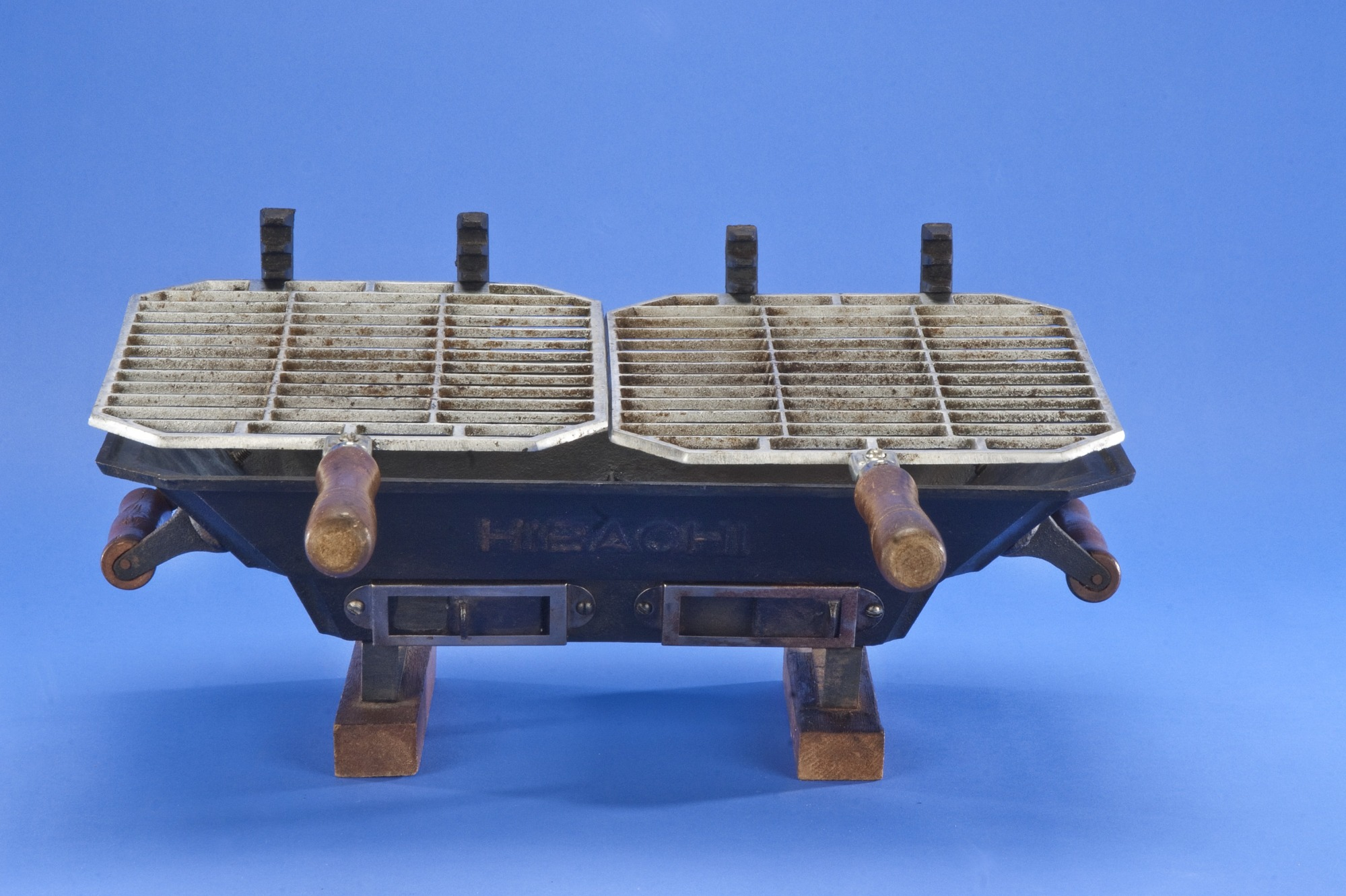
North American "hibachi" cast iron grill

The hibachi (火鉢, 'fire bowl') is a traditional Japanese heating device. It is a brazier which is a round, cylindrical, or box-shaped, open-topped container, made from or lined with a heatproof material and designed to hold burning charcoal. It is believed hibachi dates back to the Heian period (794 to 1185). They are filled with incombustible ash with charcoal sitting in the center of the ash. To handle the charcoal, a pair of metal chopsticks called hibashi (火箸; 'fire chopsticks') is used, in a way similar to Western fire irons or tongs. Hibachi were originally used for heating, not for cooking. It heats by radiation, and is too weak to warm a whole room. Sometimes, people placed a tetsubin (鉄瓶; 'iron kettle') over the hibachi to boil water for tea. Later, by the 1900s, some cooking was also done over the hibachi.

Traditional Japanese houses were well ventilated so carbon monoxide poisoning or suffocation from carbon dioxide from burning charcoal was of lesser concern. Nevertheless, such risks do exist, and proper handling is necessary to avoid accidents. Hibachi must never be used in airtight rooms such as those in Western buildings.

In North America, the term hibachi refers to a small cooking stove heated by charcoal (called a shichirin in Japanese), or to an iron hot plate (called a teppan in Japanese) used in teppanyaki restaurants.

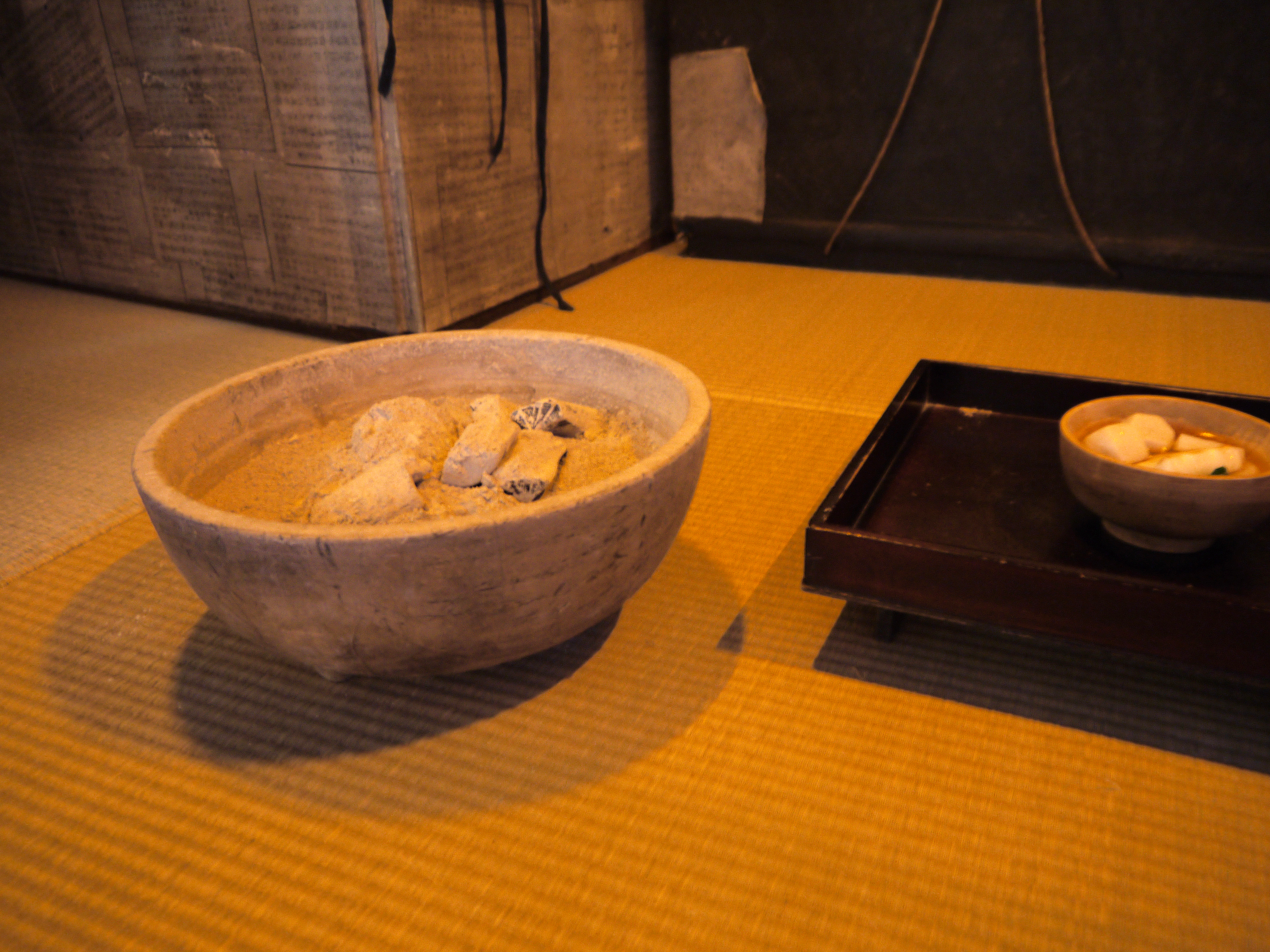
Primitive hibachi from before the Edo period (1600–1868) (Fukagawa Edo Museum)

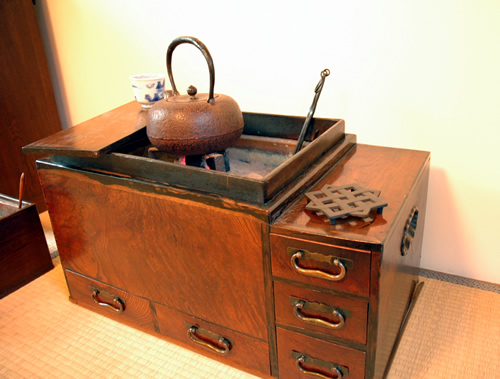
A traditional charcoal hibachi, made c. 1880–1900

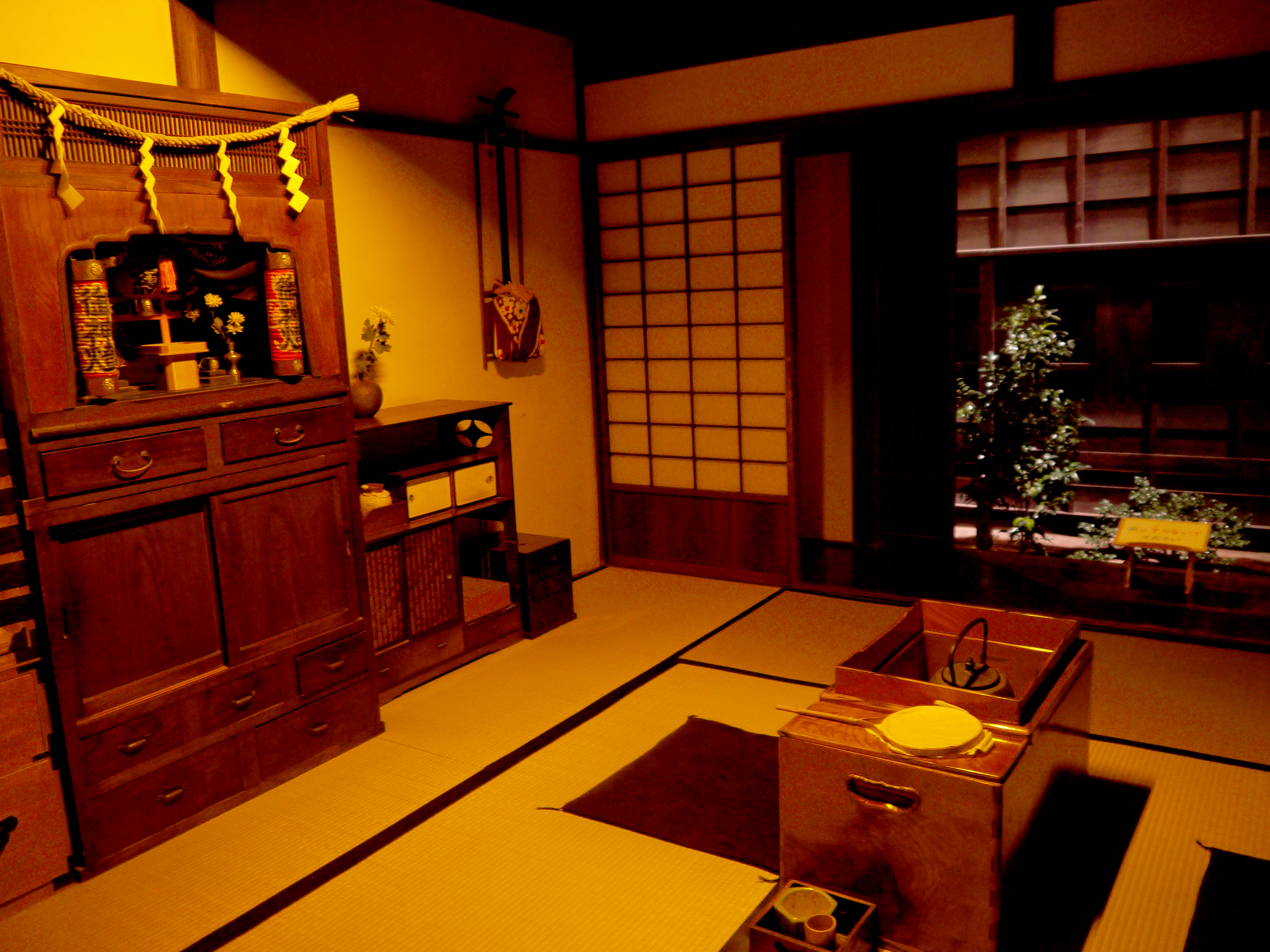
House of the Edo period (Fukagawa Edo Museum)

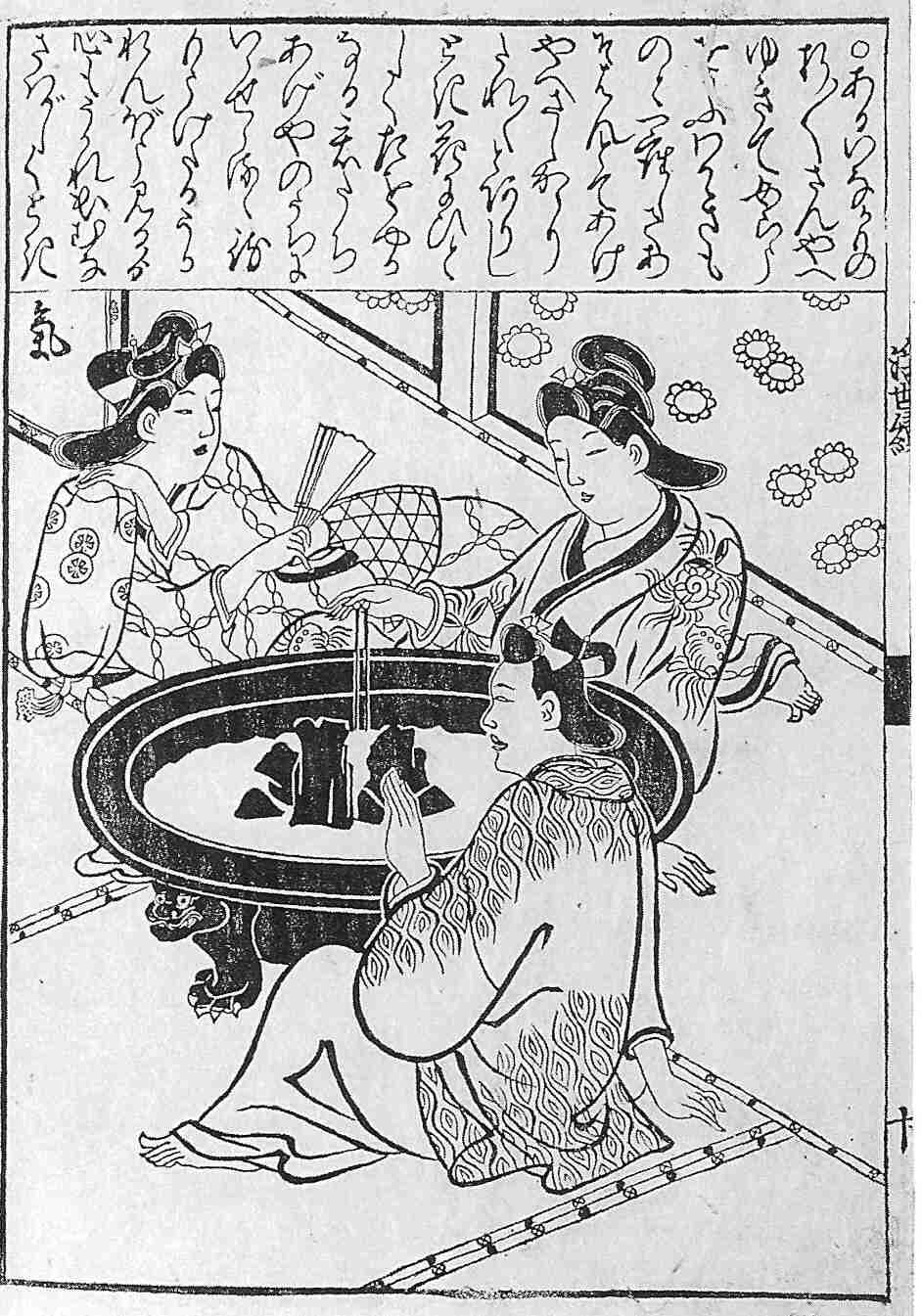
Two women and a man warming themselves by a hibachi

== See also ==
- Brazier
- Japanese traditional heating devices:
  - Kamado: a kitchen stove
  - Shichirin: a portable brazier
  - Tabako-bon: a mini brazier to light tobacco in kiseru pipes
  - Kotatsu: a covered table over a brazier
  - Japanese tea utensils § Hearths
    - Chagama
    - Tetsubin
- Japanese cuisine
