= Teppanyaki =

Style of Japanese cuisine

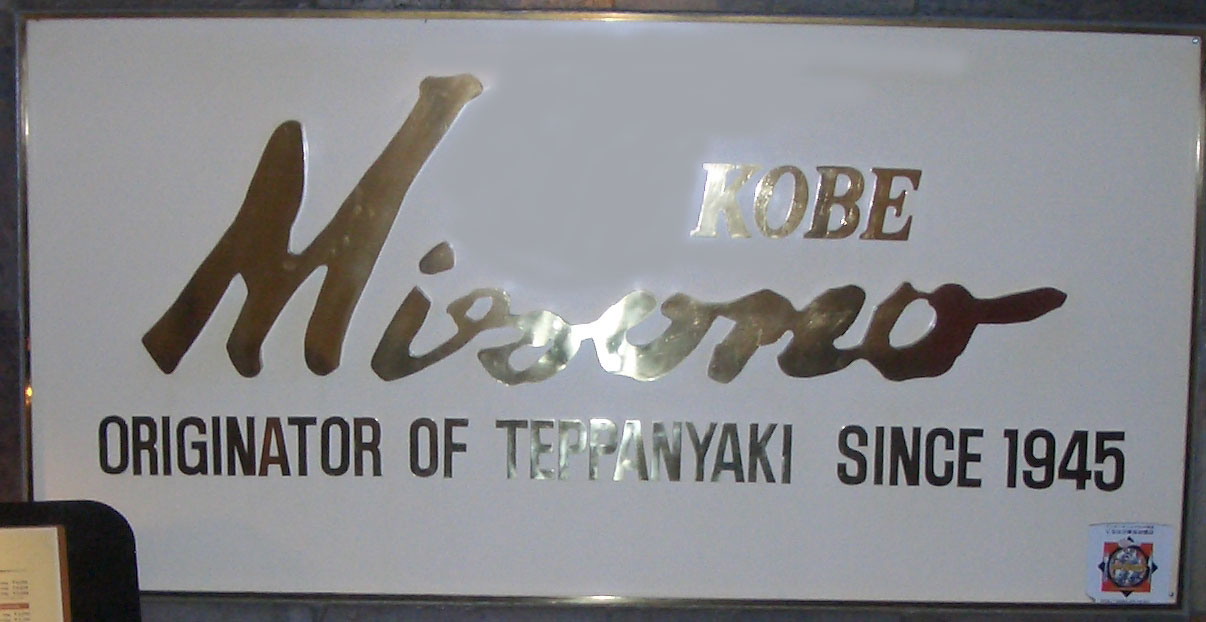
Misono in Kobe—the first restaurant to offer teppanyaki

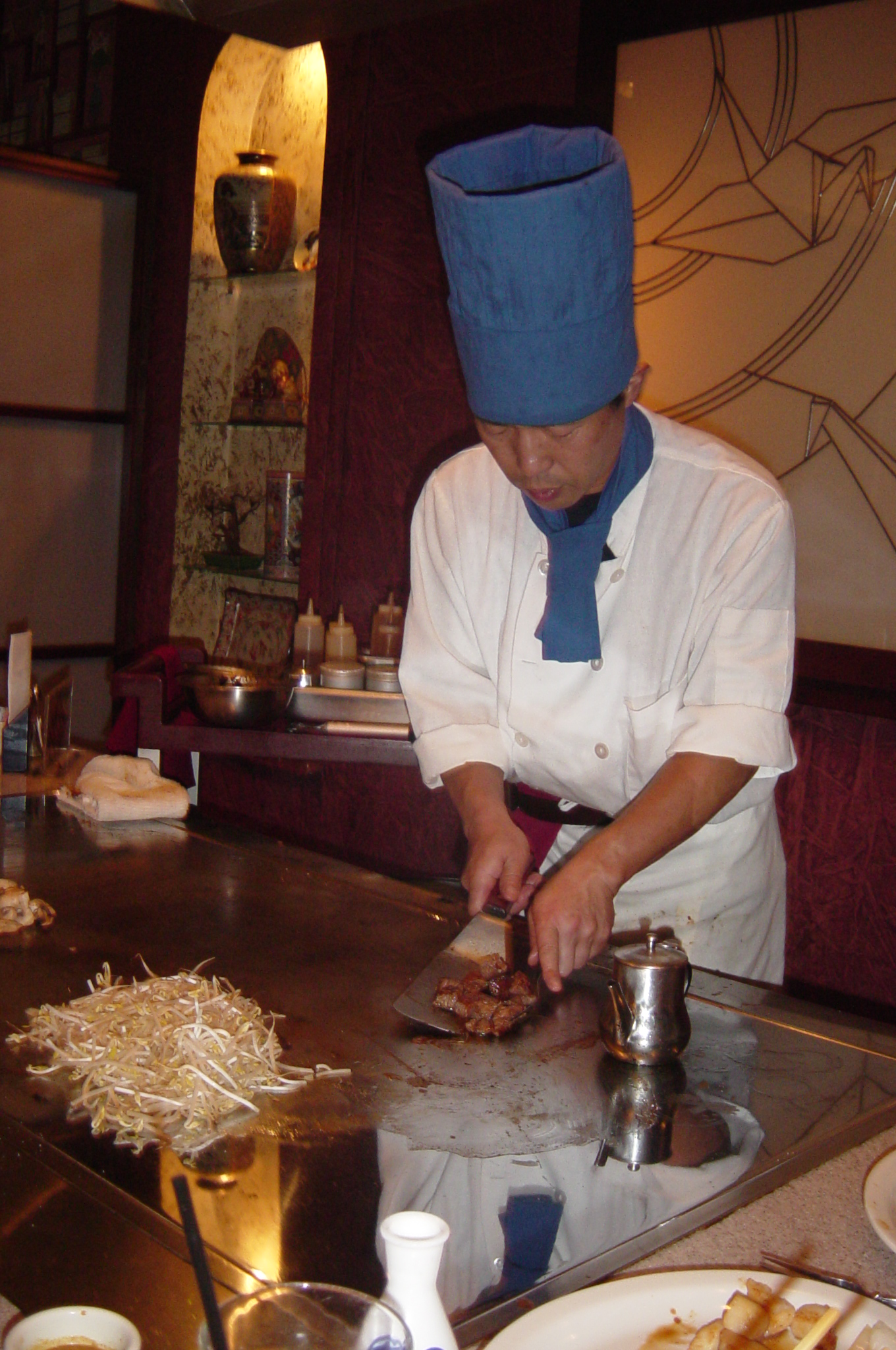
A teppanyaki chef cooking at a gas-powered teppan in a Japanese steakhouse

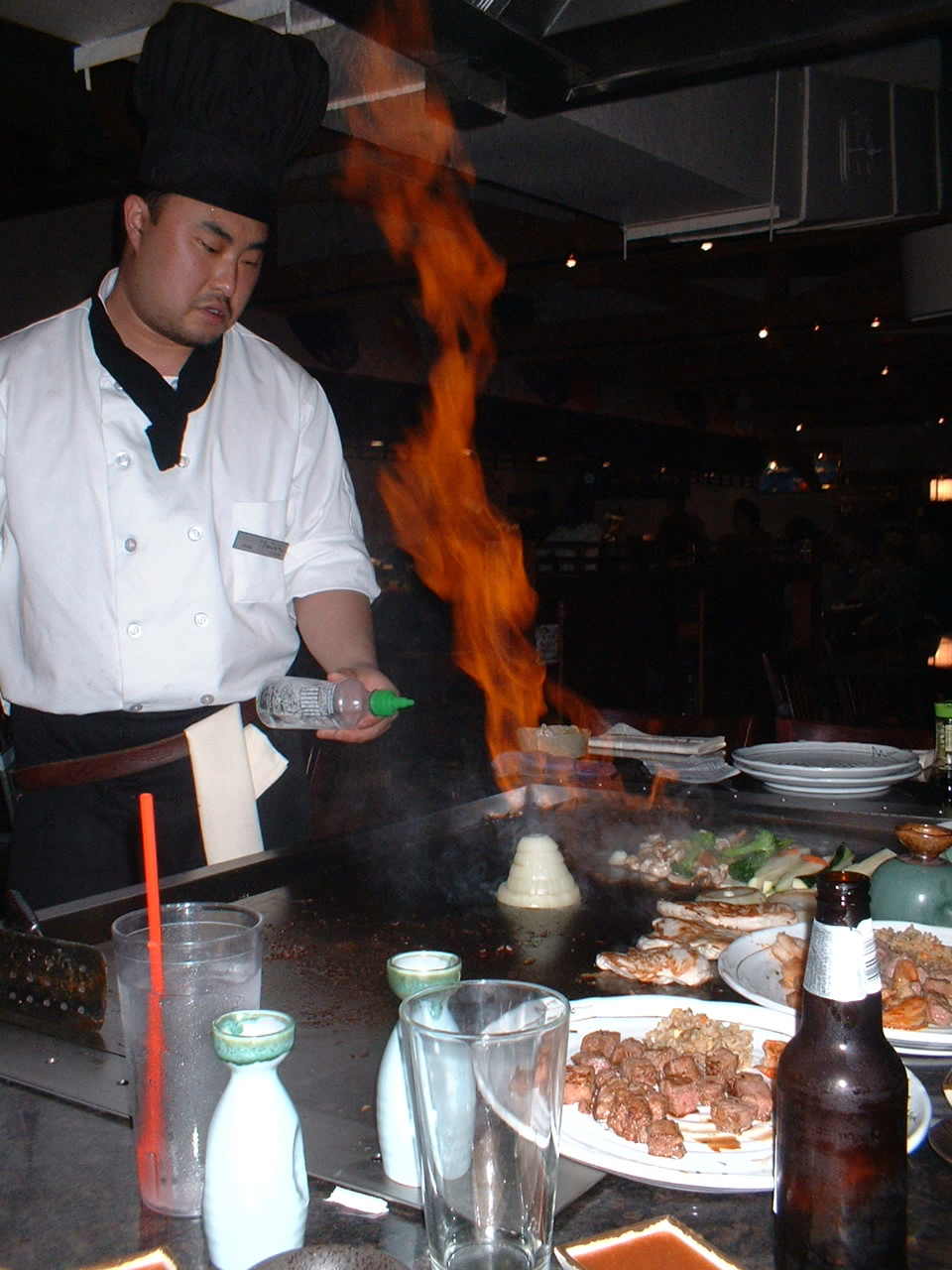
Chef preparing a flaming onion volcano

Teppanyaki (鉄板焼き, teppan-yaki; pronounced [teppaɰ̃jakʲi]) is a post–World War II style of Japanese cuisine that uses an iron griddle to cook food. The word teppanyaki is derived from teppan (鉄板), the metal plate on which it is cooked, and yaki (焼き), which means grilled, broiled, or pan-fried. In Japan, teppanyaki refers to dishes cooked using a teppan, including steak, shrimp, okonomiyaki, yakisoba, and monjayaki.

Teppan are typically propane-heated and flat-surfaced, and they are often used to cook food in front of guests at restaurants. In the USA, they are commonly called hibachi though that refers to a type of grill in Japan, including a shichirin in Japanese, which has a charcoal or gas flame and is made with an open grate design. With a solid griddle-type cook surface, the teppan is capable of cooking small or semisolid ingredients such as rice, egg and finely chopped vegetables.

== Origin ==
The originator of the teppanyaki-style steakhouse is believed to be Shigeji Fujioka of the Japanese restaurant chain Misono. The restaurant claims to be the first to introduce the concept of cooking Western-influenced food on a teppan in Japan, in 1945. They soon found the cuisine was less popular with the Japanese than it was with foreigners, who enjoyed both watching the skilled maneuvers of the chefs preparing the food and the cuisine itself, which is somewhat more familiar than more traditional Japanese dishes. As the restaurants became more popular with tourists, the chain increased the performance aspect of the chef's preparation, such as stacking onion slices to produce a flaming onion volcano.

Another piece of equipment in the same family is a flattop grill, consisting of a flat piece of steel over circular burners and typically smaller and round, like a Mongolian barbecue.

== Ingredients ==
Typical ingredients used for Western-style teppanyaki are beef, shrimp, scallops, lobster, chicken and assorted vegetables. Soybean oil is typically used to cook the ingredients.

Japanese-style teppanyaki may also use noodles (yakisoba) or cabbage with sliced meat or seafood (okonomiyaki), which are cooked using vegetable oil, animal fat, or a mixture. In Japan, many teppanyaki restaurants feature Kobe beef or Wagyu beef.

Side dishes of mung bean sprouts, zucchini (courgettes) (though this is not a popular vegetable in Japan and rarely found in that market), fried garlic slices, or fried rice usually accompany the meal. Some restaurants provide sauces in which to dip the food. In Japan, only soy sauce is typically offered.

== In the United States ==
In the United States, teppanyaki (more commonly known as hibachi) was made famous by the Benihana restaurant chain, which opened its first restaurant in New York City in 1964. Benihana and other chains of teppanyaki restaurants continue to place an emphasis on the chef performing a show for the diners and continuing to introduce new variations and tricks. The chef might juggle utensils, flip a shrimp tail into their shirt pocket, catch an egg in their hat, toss an egg up in the air and split it with a spatula, or flip flattened shrimp pieces into diners' mouths.

== Image gallery ==
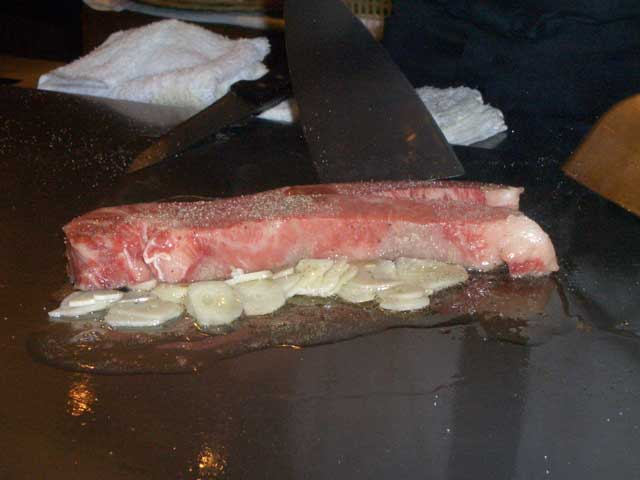
Kobe beef with garlic chips

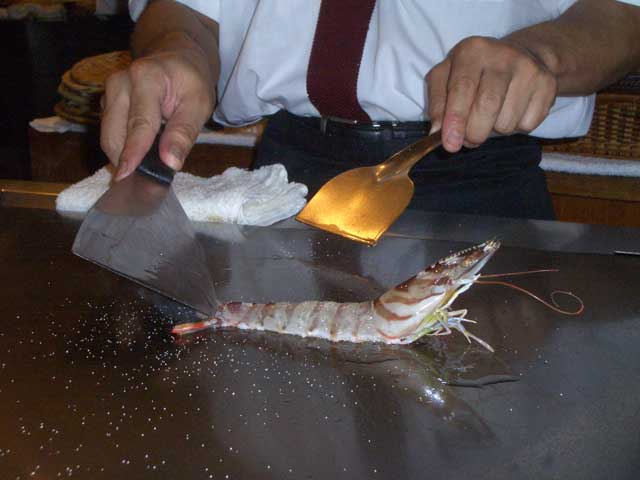
Live jumbo prawn

== See also ==
- Japanese cuisine
