= Outdoor cooking =

Preparation of food outdoors

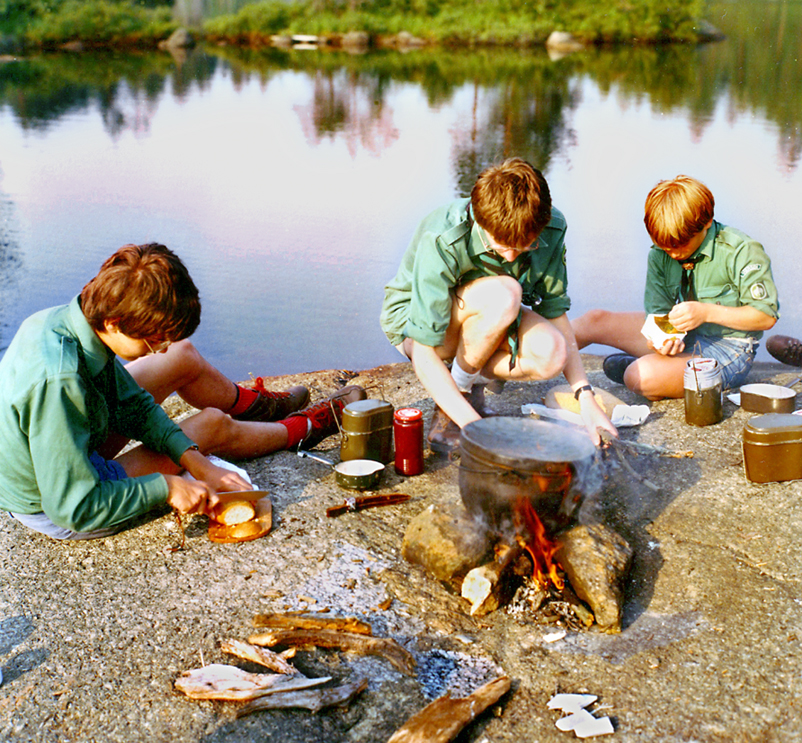
Outdoor cooking with a large pot and other utensils

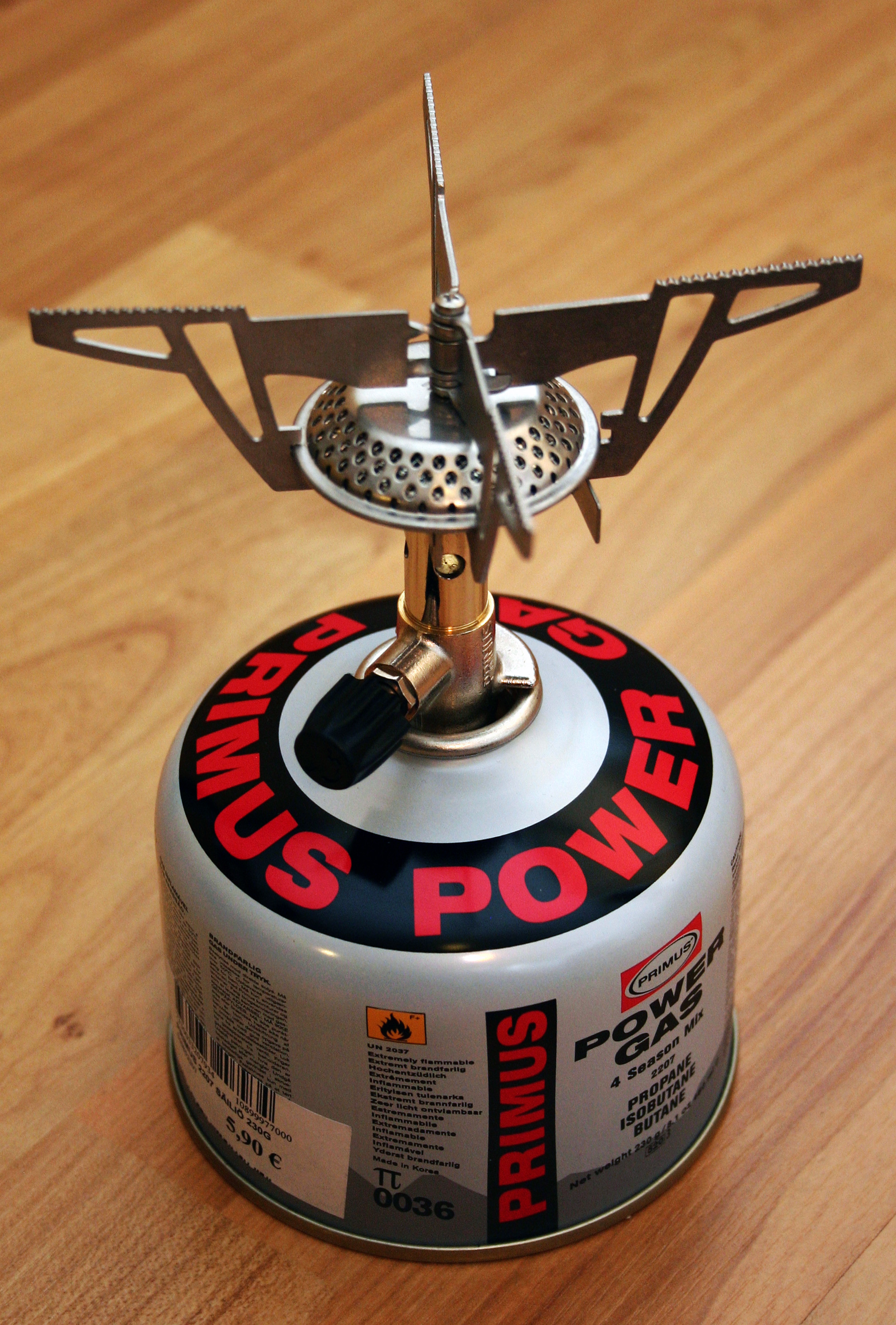
A gas cartridge portable stove

Outdoor cooking is the preparation of food in the outdoors. A significant body of techniques and specialized equipment exists for it, traditionally associated with nomadic cultures such as the Berbers of North Africa, the Arab Bedouins, the Plains Indians, pioneers in North America, and indigenous tribes in South America. These methods have been refined in modern times for use during recreational outdoor pursuits, by campers and backpackers.

Currently, much of the work of maintaining and developing outdoor cooking traditions in Westernized countries is done by the Scouting movement and by wilderness educators such as the National Outdoor Leadership School and Outward Bound, as well as by writers and cooks closely associated with the outdoors community.

== Food and recipes ==
The type of food common in outdoors settings is somewhat different compared to household foods and also differs depending on the type of cooking activity. While someone at a public campground may have easy access to a grocery store and be able to prepare plenty of recipes with fresh meat and vegetables, someone on an extended trip into the backcountry will not be able to carry large amounts of fresh food, due to the extra weight from high water content, and will have to rely heavily on food with low water content, such as dried meats and vegetables, packaged dehydrated camping foods, and starches such as ramen, polenta, and dried potato flakes. Wilderness experts in both categories sometimes make use of locally available wild foods as well, particularly wild vegetables and fruit but also occasionally fresh fish and wild game; however, it is not unusual for camping food, especially backcountry food, to be partially or totally vegetarian.

Camping food is often very high in fat and carbohydrates to provide energy for long hikes, and hikers (much like soldiers) must rely heavily on energy-packed snacks such as trail mix, chocolate, energy bars, and sports drinks. Water can also be at a premium, so important parts of a camper's pantry include chlorine or iodine-based water disinfectants as well as drink mixes to mask the flavor of the chemical treatment.

Recipes are often designed with significant planning and home preparation in mind, with certain ingredients mixed at home and then cooked on the trail; to that end, there are several providers of freeze-dried food, both ingredients and full meals, to the outdoors market, and just-add-water instant meals (including hot cereals, pasta or rice in sauce, and instant soup) from the supermarket are popular as well. Alternatively, some wilderness experts advocate bulk rationing, in which each hiker is given a selection of raw ingredients and prepares a meal from scratch on the trail.

== Methods ==
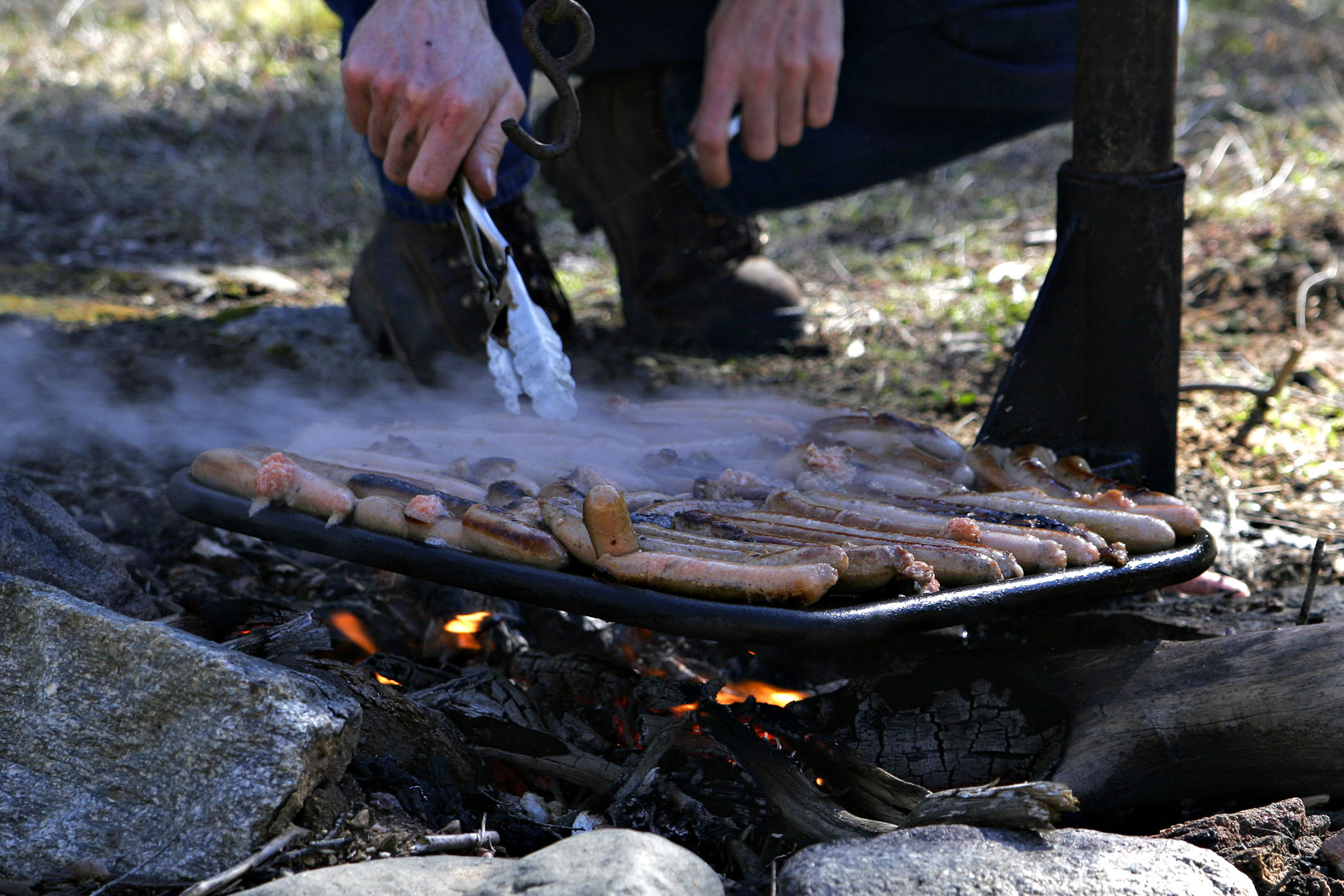
Australian "snags" (English style sausages) cooking on a campfire

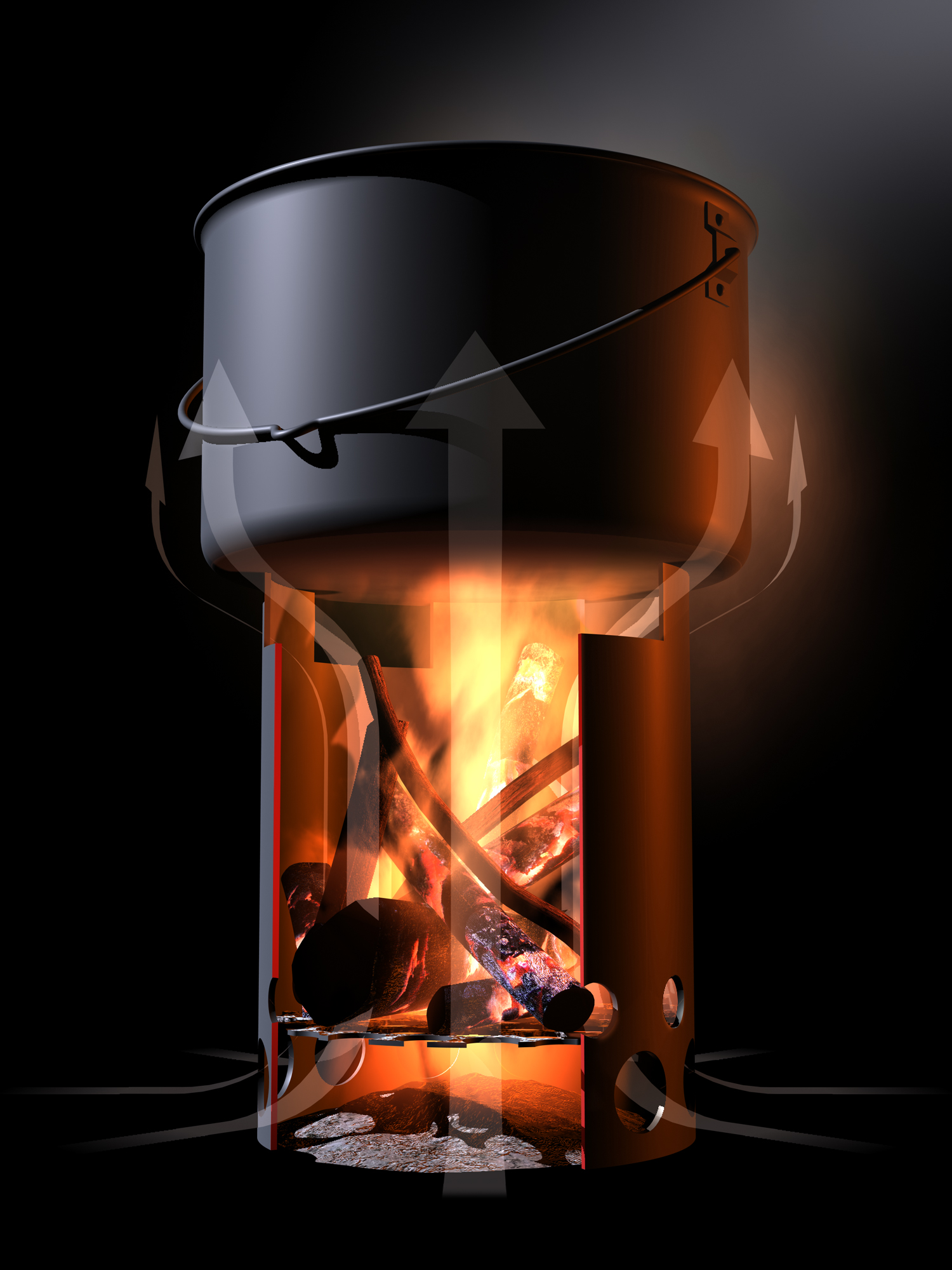
Heat convection in a hobo stove (schematic)

Most outdoor cooking is dictated by the foods themselves which are to be cooked. The first five discussions below, of direct heat, boiling, frying, grilling, and roasting, will, perhaps, describe the cooking methods employed most often in outdoor cooking. These techniques will require only rudimentary, commonsensical tools. Additional methods described further below may be of interest only to those "foodies" who carry their interests into the outdoors for gourmet meals. These advanced methods may require additional equipment or techniques.

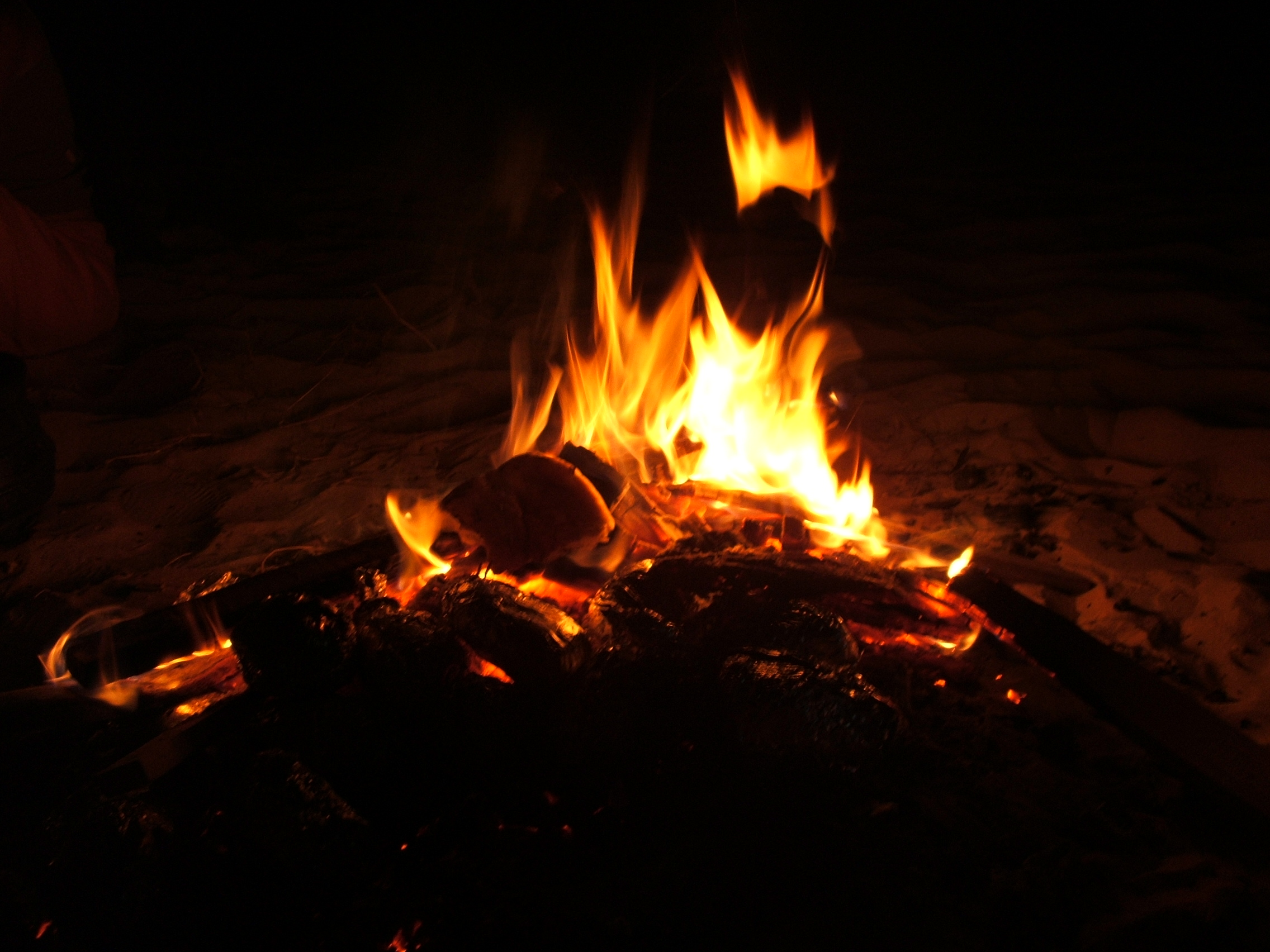
Cooking potatoes in a bonfire

The most traditional method for outdoor cooking (and indeed the oldest form of cooking known to humanity) is using a campfire. Campfires can be used for cooking food by several techniques, the food maybe suspended in the flames or in direct contact with the fuel. The techniques for cooking on a campfire are no different from those used for everyday cooking before the invention of stoves or when stoves were still not available. Individuals who are backpacking in an area that allows the gathering of firewood may decide to cook on a campfire to avoid the need to carry extra equipment; however, most campfire cooking is done outside of wilderness areas. Cooking food using a campfire can be tricky for those not accustomed to it; also, due to the risk of fire damage, campfires are illegal in many areas, so many campers prefer to use a portable stove instead.

=== Direct dry heat ===
==== Grilling ====
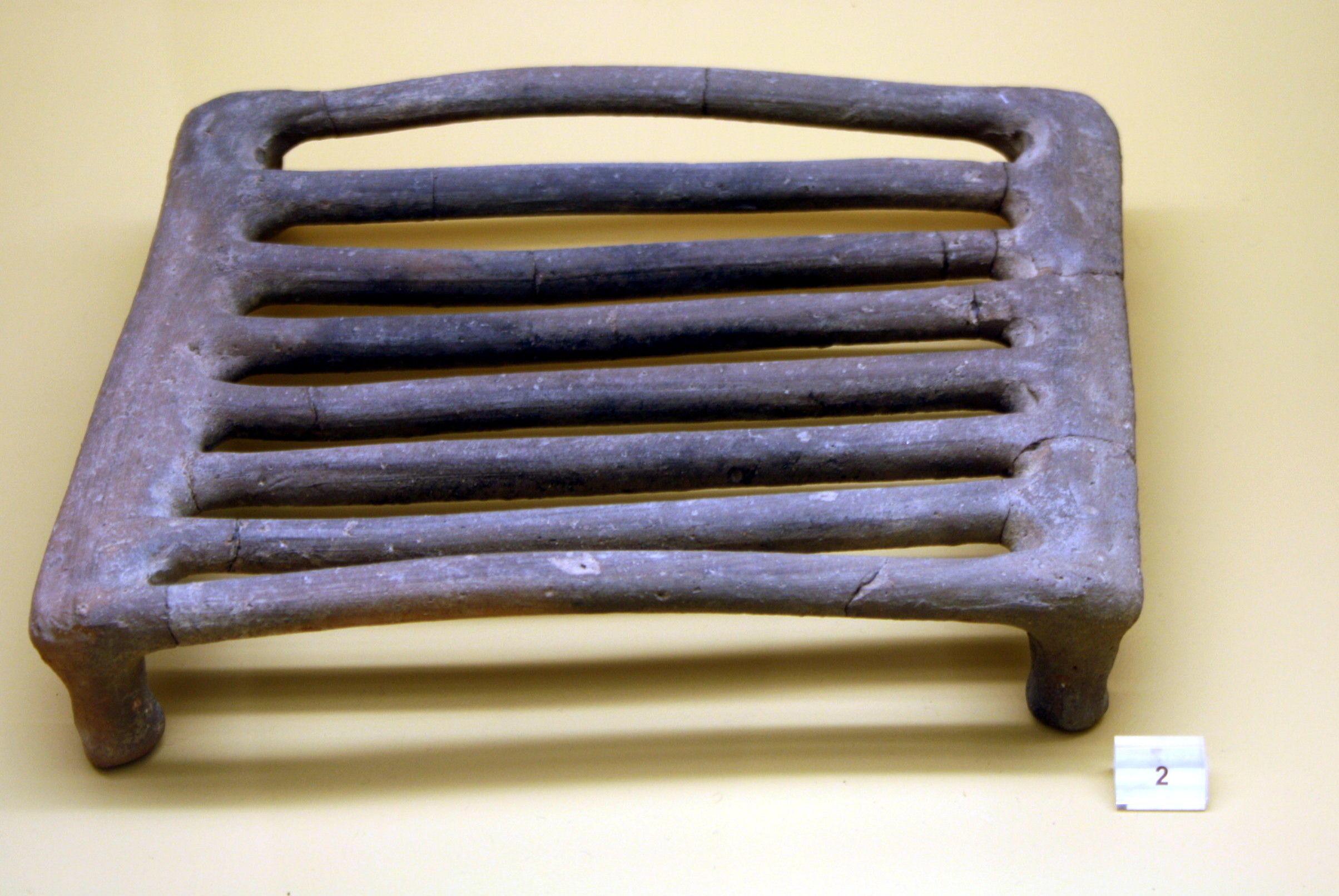
A grill, circa 4th-6th century BC, exhibited in the Ancient Agora Museum in Athens, housed in the Stoa of Attalus

Grills are simple to use and food being grilled tends to pick up some flavor from the smoke, although that is not by design as in a Barbecue where the meat is cooked slowly over hours at a significantly lower temperature. Grills over a campfire are used in the same way as an ordinary backyard charcoal grill. If the food is simply placed on the grill, it may catch fire so it requires constant attention. Hand-held grills, aka broilers that clamp over the food may be used for various tasks like warming food, grilling burgers or sausages or making toast. In cases where open fires are not allowed, lightweight charcoal grills (sometimes considered a type of hibachi) are sometimes used for direct grilling of food.

==== Roasting ====
Possibly the simplest method of cooking over a campfire and one of the most common is to roast food on long skewers that can be held above the flames. This is popular for cooking hot dogs or toasting marshmallows for making s'mores. Hungarians often roast slab bacon (Szalonna) over a campfire. Besides skewers and fireplace popcorn poppers, pie irons too may be used (small iron molds with long handles), into which can be placed slices of bread with some form of filling — which are placed over hot coals to cook. When using meat, roasting can have the advantage over grilling in that the grease that drips from the food can be reused. This can be done by placing a fireproof container under the food.

==== Frying ====
Frying is not always necessary, but is often used for fish or wild game caught while on the trip, as well as pancakes and certain kinds of bread and desserts made on the trail. As a general rule, the frying medium used in camp cooking is usually either vegetable oil or margarine. Normal (salted) butter may also be appropriate for camp use, but unsalted butter or lard may not be, due to their shorter shelf life.

Camp frying pans often lack handles for easy packing, with the camp cook using a clamp-like device to pick up and move the pan. Camp frying pans are generally made out of very thin metal (though some campers do use cast iron pans for this purpose as well), so extra care must be taken to evenly cook the food, especially over the small-diameter flame of a portable stove. A "round the clock" technique, where the frying pan is moved repeatedly to expose different parts of its base to the flame, is the most commonly recommended solution to the problem, though it is also possible to use a flame diffuser to achieve the same effect. For campfire use, on the other hand, some camp cooks prefer a legged cast-iron pan called a "spider", which is elevated to allow a small fire directly beneath it.

Camp cooks making pancakes in a moderate-size pan often simplify their work and speed up their service by pouring enough batter to make one large, moderate-thickness pancake that takes up the entire pan and then cutting the final product with the spatula to serve individual portions. Also, camp cooks often replicate toast using a frying pan: a bread slice (or more, or a combination of whole and cut portions) is placed in a well-greased pan, pressed down with a spatula, flipped, and pressed down again.

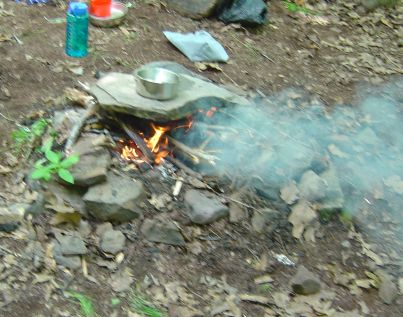
Cooking in the outdoors using heated stone

An improvised griddle can be made by putting a flat stone directly on the fire (or above it, on top of other stones). Food is then placed on the stone.

=== Indirect dry heat ===
==== Baking ====
A homemade reflector oven

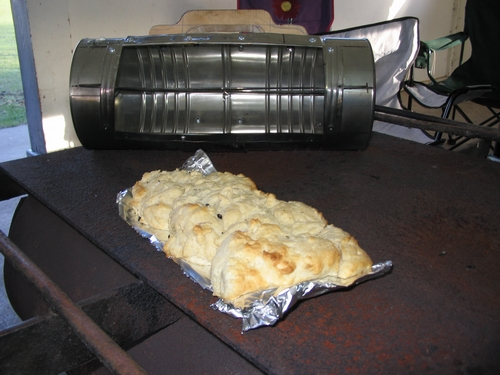
A reflector oven prior to use

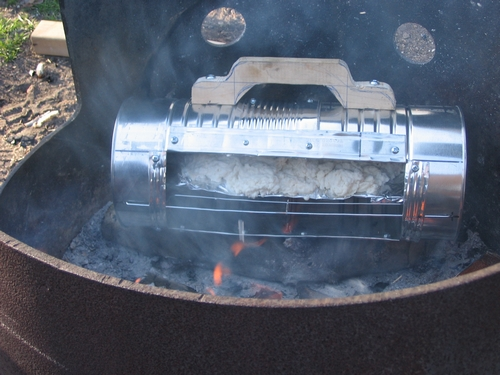
The oven set directly on hot coals

Putting a baking sheet pan over a furnace can allow for baking, which is in turn derived from the concept of the masonry oven. This was common for centuries, used to make bread, pies, and other items, and is still popular today, particularly among campers who enjoy stuffing their meats. Ovens can be made from cast iron, sheet metal, or aluminum foil-covered cardboard boxes. Reflector ovens are metal containers designed to surround an article of food being baked over an open flame and reflect the heat towards the food.

==== Dutch ovens and other pots ====
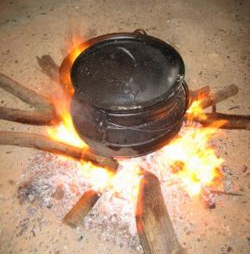
A cast iron potjie on a fire, very similar to a Dutch oven

Closely associated with the American Old West, the Dutch oven of tradition is a heavy cast iron pot, traditionally made with three short legs and a concave cover for holding hot coals on top. While such pots are generally considered too heavy for backpackers, Dutch ovens are often used in group camp-outs and cookouts.

Dutch ovens were traditionally specially designed for camping, and such pots (often with legs and a handle, both for suspending the pot over a fire) are still widely available, though sometimes at a premium over flat-bottomed stove-top models. The oven is placed in a bed of hot coals, often from a keyhole fire with additional coals placed on top of the lid, which in camp ovens usually has a raised rim to keep the coals from falling off. Dutch ovens are made of cast iron or aluminium and are generally not considered suitable for backpacking due to the heavy weight of the pot. Dutch ovens are convenient for cooking dishes that take a long time such as stews, joints of meat, and baked goods. They are not the only option for baking on a campout as devices for baking on portable stoves exist and clay ovens can be constructed at longer encampments. A pot hanging over the fire, although picturesque, may spill, and the rigging may be difficult to construct from found wood. Generally, this is done with metal rigging, much of it identical to that historically used in home fireplaces before the invention of stoves. Two vertical iron bars with an iron cross-piece allow pots to be hung at various heights or over different temperatures of fire. Griddles, grills, and skewers can also be hung over the fire. When working with wood, one may use two tripods, lashed with tripod lashings, but the rope will be liable to melt or burn. Dovetail joints are more secure but difficult to carve.

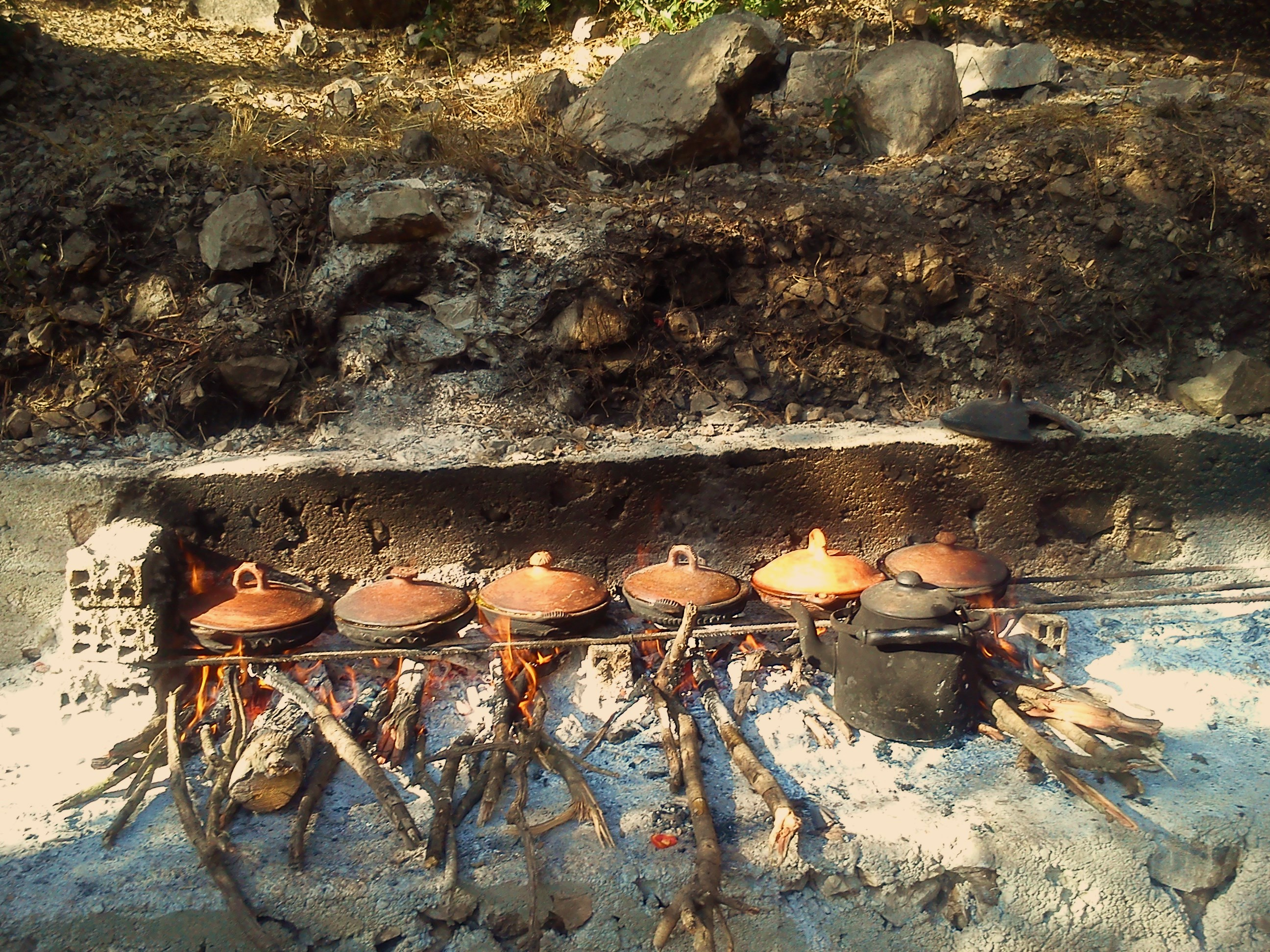
Outdoor cooking using a Tajine

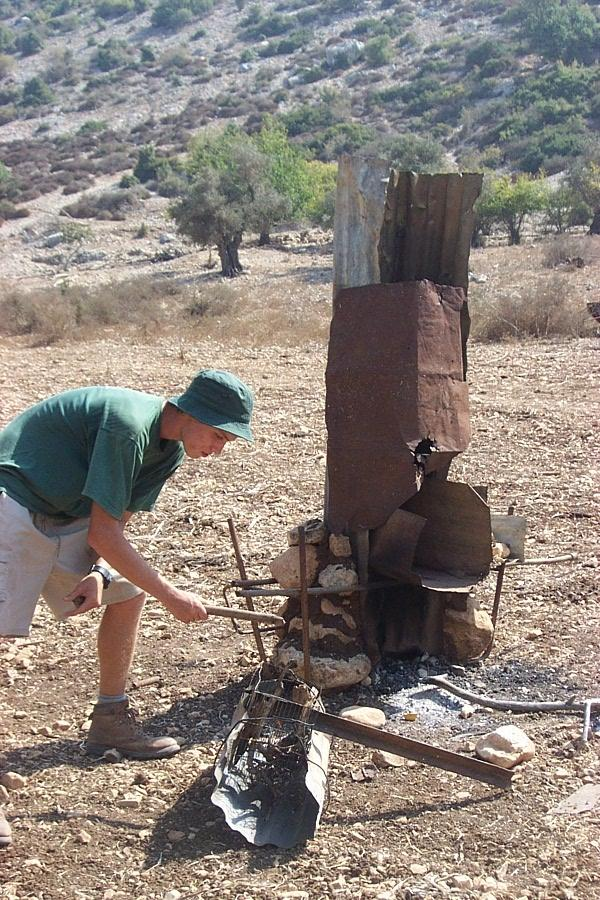
An oven constructed from found materials

A good alternative to cooking with a tripod is to cook directly on the fire itself. To do this properly the fire needs to have a reasonable bed of coals and to have burned down to the point where it is not a roaring fire. While the pot may be set directly upon the coals, this is not preferable since that will tend to extinguish the coals. To lift the pot up off the fire, often two small logs of similar size may be used on either side of the pot; camp-style Dutch ovens have three legs built into the pot to perform this function. An alternative is the use of a metal thread or mesh fire basket. This allows continued airflow through the fire while providing optimal heat. The one downside to this form of cooking is that the pots will become blackened with soot and ash, which can be difficult to scrub off. The ash and soot buildup can be easily avoided by applying a thin layer of dish soap (preferably biodegradable) to the outside of the pot before cooking. The ash and soot will stick to the soap which is then easily rinsed off later.

=== Wet heat ===
==== Boiling ====
In backpacking particularly, boiling water is the most common kitchen operation undertaken on the trail, used for cooking or reconstituting food, making hot beverages, cleaning up, and even sanitizing drinking water. Portable stoves are therefore generally rated in terms of how quickly they can boil a liter (or another appropriate size) of water; indeed, some commercial stove models are specifically optimized for fast boiling, with other operations such as frying or baking being an afterthought.

Like camp frying pans, camp pots are generally made of very lightweight material (often aluminum or, at a considerable price premium, titanium). Though less of a worry given the thermal mass of water, the camp cook must still take care not to allow food to burn, since the pot itself has very little mass to spread the heat out.

Alternatively, a fireproof container (e.g. mess can, bamboo segment or improvised tree bark pot) is placed (or hung) above the fire.

==== Steaming ====
Bamboo steaming

Can-in-can steaming

Steaming, that is cooking via water vapor, is possible with plants such as bamboo. In this method, a piece of bamboo is set diagonally above a fire. The bamboo is perforated from within (between the joints) and water is placed in the lowest bamboo segment. Food (e.g. rice) is then placed in the top segment which is steamed due to the water evaporating from the heat in the lowest segment.

==== Other covered techniques ====
A Māori earth oven

The original form of covered cooking is the earth oven, simply a covered pit with a fire built in it, demonstrated in techniques such as the Polynesian umu/Hāngī, the Indian tandoori, and the Native American clambake.

Another commonly used technique is the baking of food in aluminum foil packets. Food is wrapped inside a durable packet of tin or aluminum foil, crimped to seal, and placed on or under hot coals. Baked potatoes are commonly cooked this way but entire meals can be cooked in one packet. Besides aluminum or tin, organic material such as leaves (of trees, "Nelumbo nucifera" lotus, "Dendrocalamus lactiferous Munro" bamboo aka Bambusa oldhamii (麻竹葉), phragmites, plantain, taro, etc.), husks (of corn, "Phyllostachys makinoi" bamboo (桂竹籜), etc.), and skins of fruit (citrus, etc.) are also frequently employed. Tree leaves such as those from the banana tree do not burn/ignite as they contain enough oil to resist the heat from the flames (at least until the frying is complete). The way to adapt recipes where food is wrapped in foil is to use a barrier such as baking or silicone paper between the food and the foil; the overall technique is similar to the en papillote technique developed in French cuisine but uses a more robust container.

Other simple methods include clay wrapping food (such as in the kleftiko method used in Greek cuisine), leaf wrapping, and plank grilling, where food is cooked on a wooden plank set above the fire. Hot-stone cooking, where food is placed on a heated stone next to or even in the fire, or where fire-heated stones are dropped into a pot are other methods.

Long-distance truckers, automotive travelers, and rally racers have occasionally resorted to cooking on accessible sections of the vehicle engine; the book Manifold Destiny, though written to a certain extent as a humor book, is considered the authoritative reference on the subject. The food is usually wrapped in several layers of aluminum foil and secured onto the engine block or other hot parts of the engine.

In some areas where there is a significant amount of steady, less-hazardous volcanic activity, lava cooking (invented in Hawaii) is sometimes practiced as a novelty. The food does not come in direct contact with the molten rock, instead being wrapped in a moist barrier (usually wet tropical leaves such as banana foliage or ti leaves). The wrapper is sacrificial, and is chipped or otherwise cleaned off along with the cooled lava before serving.

== Backwoods cooking, without utensils ==
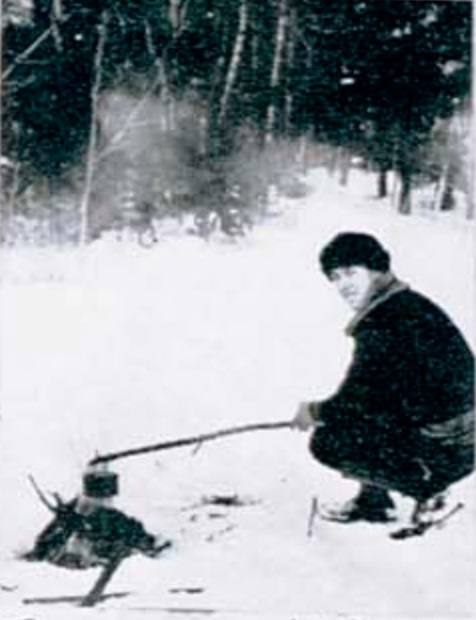
From a 1921–1922 yearbook, Sturgeon Bay, Wisconsin

Backwood cooking is a method of cooking without the use of kitchen implements. It commonly takes place in the backwoods, often in combination with wild or conventional camping. Some variants of backwoods cooking allow the use of items of cookware such as a cooking pot; however there are many recipes without any. Some backwoods alternatives to cookware include aluminium foil, fruit skins, and heated stones. Traditionally backwoods cooking takes place over a wood-burning fire because wood is the most available fuel source in the backwoods. As a result, some recipes include information about the intensity of the fire to be used.

Backwoods cooking is widely practiced within the Scouting movement. While it is most associated with scouting today, the term "backwoods cooking" pre-dates Scouting by at least 25 years. Within scouting it may also be known as "lightweight cooking," which may also have a focus on using aluminum foil for cookware for much lighter-weight cooking.

Scouts around the world take part in different backwoods cooking competitions. These competitions are often local in scope, group or district competitions, but some are held by national scout associations; such as that held by the Scout Association of Malta.

== Specialist equipment ==
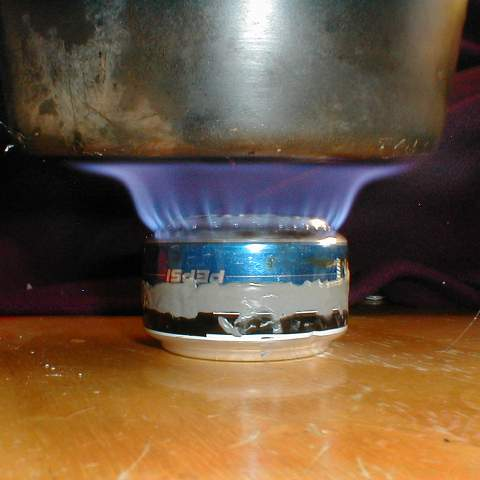
A beverage-can stove, fueled by denatured alcohol (the pot stand is omitted for clarity)

A solar cooker (HotPot brand)

Portable stoves are widely used in areas where fuel such as wood is scarce or there is a significant fire or environmental hazard to building a campfire. Such devices usually use liquid fuel (usually a petroleum derivative or some kind of alcohol), but gaseous fuels like propane, butane and solid fuels such as wood shavings and hexamine are also used depending on the stove design; while two-burner models are commonly used for front-country camp stoves and function much like residential gas stoves, backpacking stoves generally put out a much more concentrated and less powerful flame and require lightweight cooking equipment ("billycans") made of aluminum or titanium rather than more typical kitchen-type utensils.

In addition, there are often special techniques for baked goods made on the trail in the absence of specialized camp oven equipment, including flipping over the (lidded) pan while on the heat and the "twiggy fire", which mimics the use of charcoal on the lid of a Dutch oven using a small campfire on the lid of the pan.

Reflector ovens are placed on the ground next to the fire, and gather thermal radiation from it.

Solar cookers are a type of equipment that is powered by the sun, and no other fuel is required, creating a positive environmental impact. There are large variations of design and functionality, where the parabolic solar cookers offer the highest temperature, often more than 750 degrees F. SolSource solar stove is an example of a high-temperature solar stove.

Ceramic grills come in many guises and have been around in simple format since ancient times. Many modern cookers sport ornate designs that can be quite beautiful. These grills cook well and efficiently because they retain heat and seal in moisture. Most quality grills are weatherproof and can be used year-round to grill, BBQ, smoke, and bake. Other benefits include fast heating time and a lack of hot spots. They are fuel-efficient, using a minimum of charcoal, and may be safer for children due to the lack of hot spots.

== Cooking rigs ==
Various cooking rigs

Camp cooking crane

Camp cooking crane

Camp cooking crane

Camp cooking trench

Cooking over a hunter's fire

Camp cooking pot hook

== Dangers ==
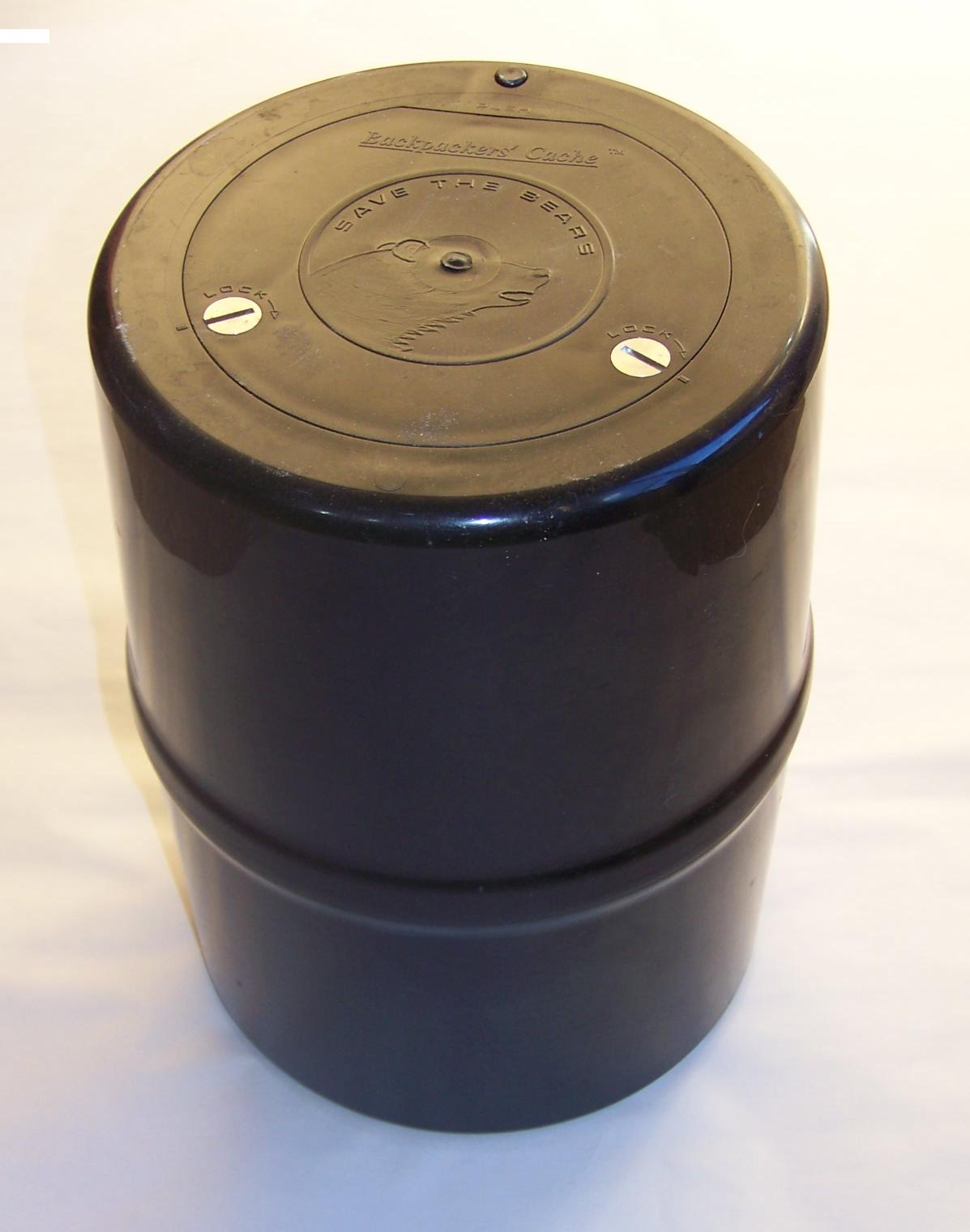
A bear-resistant food storage container

Outdoor cooking elements can be dangerous due to their high flammability and proximity to occupants. Use of highly flammable alcohols to refuel portable cookers, gas cookers need to be checked for leaks and kept well away from heat and tents in a sheltered and stable setting. Most modern tents are made of lightweight synthetic materials that are not fire retardant. Fires and flames must be properly extinguished and not left unattended. Wind can carry hot embers, possibly igniting wildfires. In rare occasions, portable camping canisters have been known to explode. These can be caused by leaks or overheating around the compressed canister. Adequate air ventilation can prevent overheating during use. It is recommended to operate such portable cooking instruments in the open, despite the pull of luxury in having them operate inside a tent. Several incidents involving camping and cooking fires have resulted in fatalities and severe injuries.

Special precautions are required for camping in the bear country because cooking activities and food storage attract these potentially dangerous animals. Food preparation and storage must be located a safe distance from sleeping areas, so a fire near the camp cannot be used for cooking. Food may need to be stored in bear cans or bear bags hung from a tree or post. Other animals may be attracted to food too; most notably raccoons, squirrels, skunks, and mice.

== See also ==
- Beverage-can stove
- Portable stove
- Barbecue
- Curanto
- Damper (food)
- Dutch oven
- Grilling
- Hāngī
- Kalua
- List of cooking techniques
- Masonry oven
- New England clam bake
- Pachamanca
- Solar cooker
