= Buddy Burner =

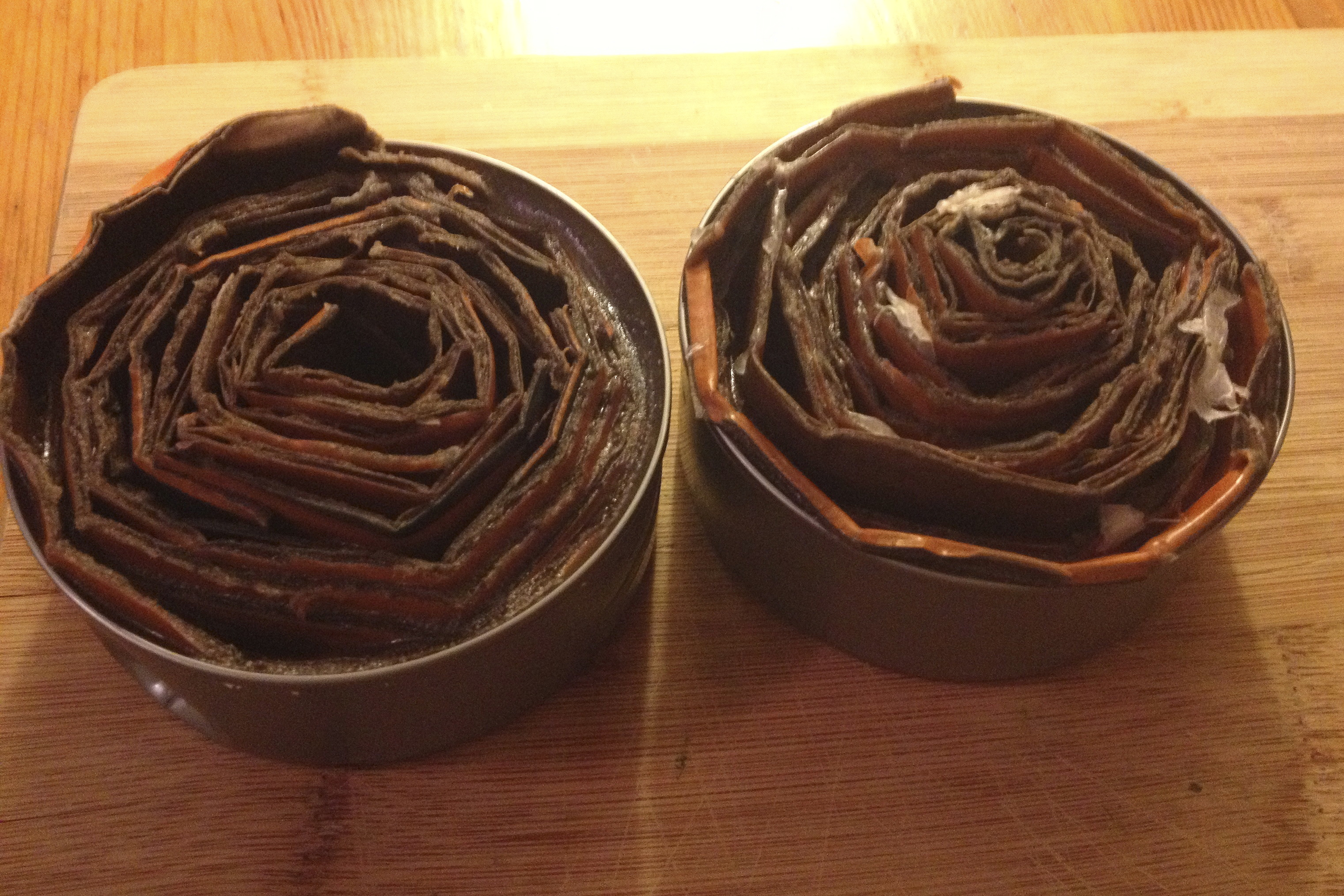
Two prepared Buddy Burners

A Buddy Burner is a simple stove made from a can and part of a corrugated paper box. It is usually fueled by paraffin wax but other fuels, such as boiled butter, animal fat or diesel fuel, can be used. It is usually used for cooking but can also provide heat.

The most common type of buddy burner is made from a tuna or cat food can because of the low profile. The corrugated paper is cut into a strip as wide as the can is tall then rolled into a tight coil and placed in the can. The can is then filled with fuel (if fueled with paraffin wax it is first melted) leaving enough of the paper above the fuel to act as a wick.

== Benefits ==
Using paraffin wax as a fuel has two advantages. First, when the burner cools the wax hardens making it convenient to keep in the burner for later use. Second, it is safe to refuel the burner while it is operating since placing solid paraffin wax on top of the burning stove involves no danger of the fresh fuel igniting explosively.

Since oxygen is necessary for combustion, holes may need to be punched around the top of the can to allow air to enter, and to provide a way for combustion gases to escape around the pot.

== Safety precautions ==
Modern canning techniques now employ plastic coatings that may produce toxic fumes when burning, therefore extra care must be taken until the coating has burned off.

Candles are usually made of paraffin wax and can be melted to put into a Buddy Burner. However, candles or paraffin wax blocks should be melted in a double boiler so that they cannot catch fire.

== See also ==
- Beverage-can stove
- Biomass cook stove
- Bunsen burner
- Portable stove
- Hobo stove
