= Reflector oven =

Cooking container used over open fire

A homemade reflector oven

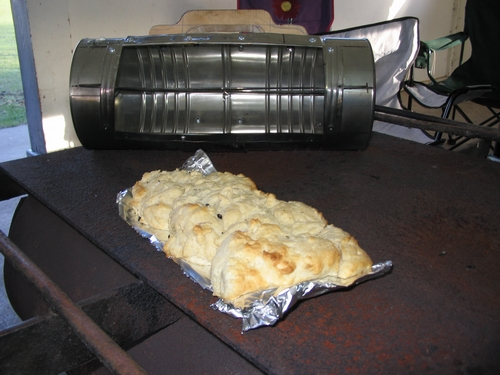
A reflector oven prior to use

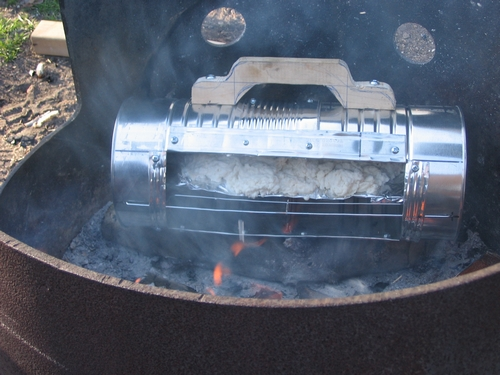
The oven set directly on hot coals

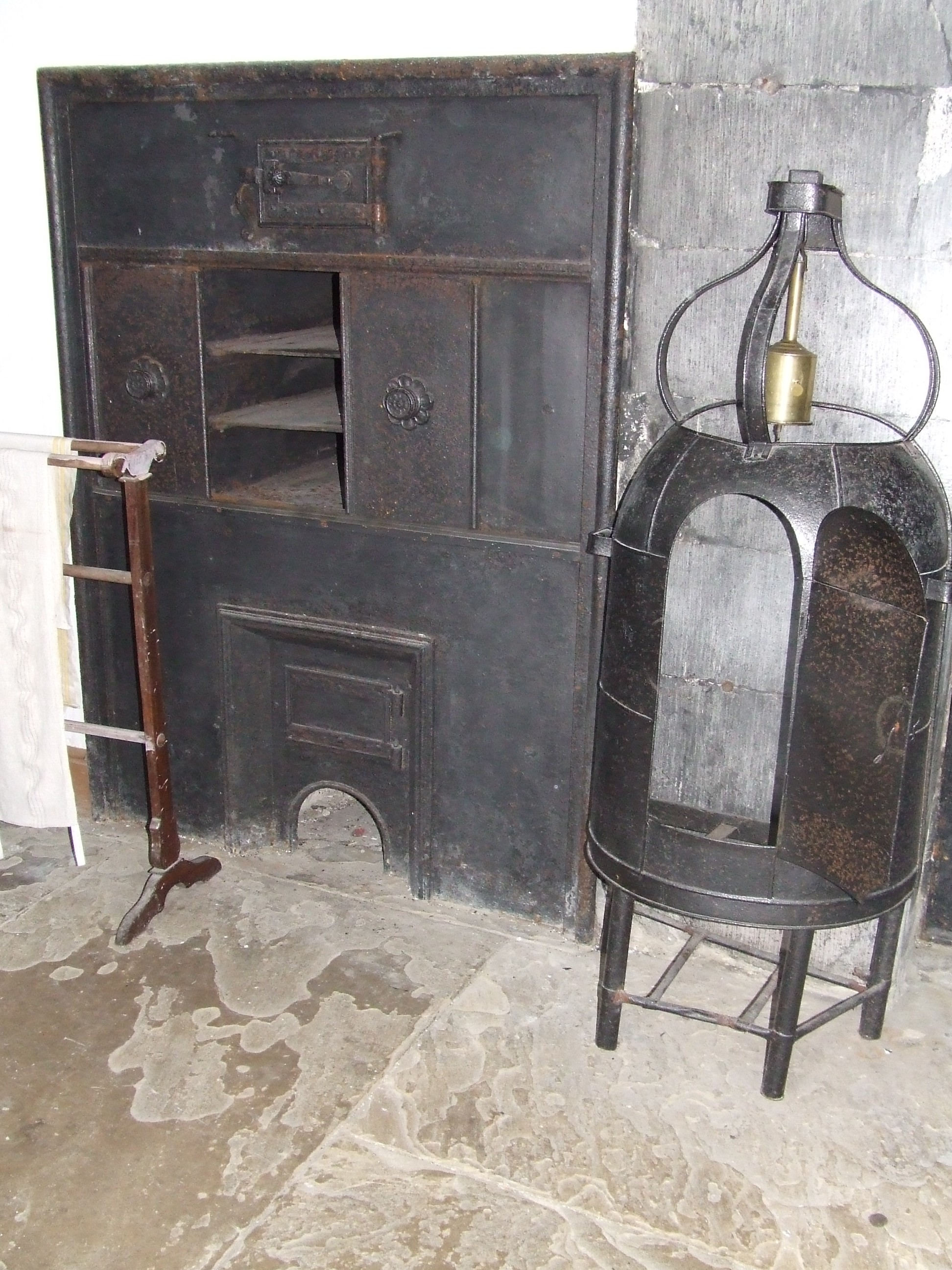
A reflector oven for cooking game birds, at Stokestown Park House

A reflector oven (sometimes known in older cooking literature as a tin kitchen) is a polished metal container, often made of tin. It is designed to enclose an article of food on all but one side, to cause it to bake by capturing radiant heat from an open fire, and reflecting the heat towards the food, avoiding smoke flavoring the food. In its simplest form, a reflector oven is simply a box or collar that partially surrounds the food, with an open side that faces the heat source, which is generally either a hearth fire or a portable stove, depending on the situation in which the food is being prepared. In Colonial America this method of baking meat, fowl, quick bread, or pastries, was a very popular method for hearth cooking.

A reflector oven that uses the Sun as its primary heat source is known as a solar cooker.

A reflector oven is set beside the fire to capture the radiant heat, and bake with it. It is often tin, new ones are made from aluminum. The picture with this article shows it being set directly on the coals.

== See also ==
- List of ovens
- Outdoor cooking
