= Hobo stove =

Improvised cooking device

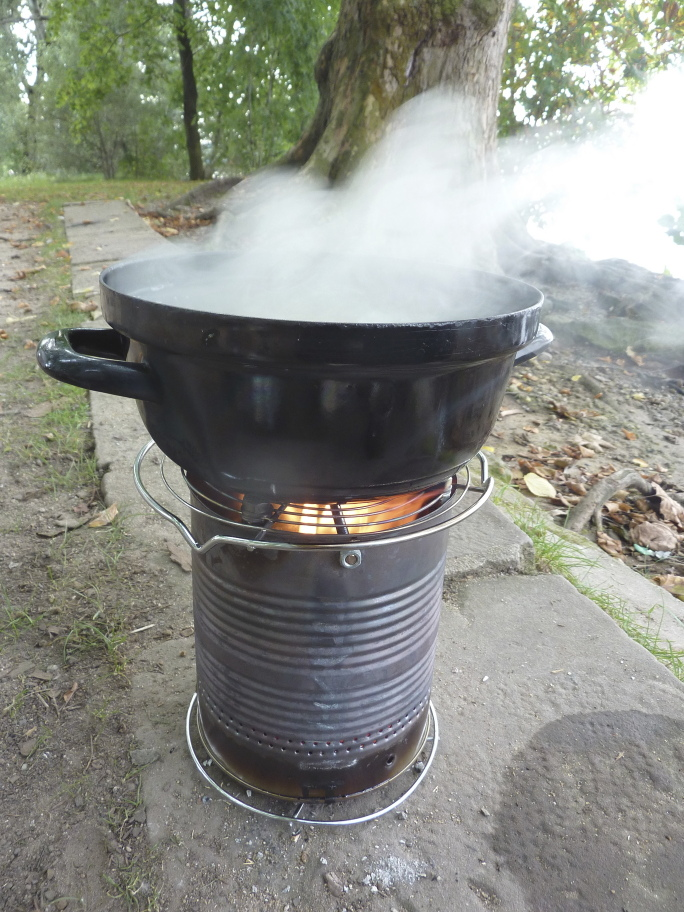
A hobo stove in use

A hobo stove is a style of improvised heat-producing and cooking device used in survival situations, by backpackers, hobos, tramps and homeless people. Hobo stoves can be functional to boil water for purification purposes during a power outage and in other survival situations, and can be used for outdoor cooking.

== Construction and uses ==
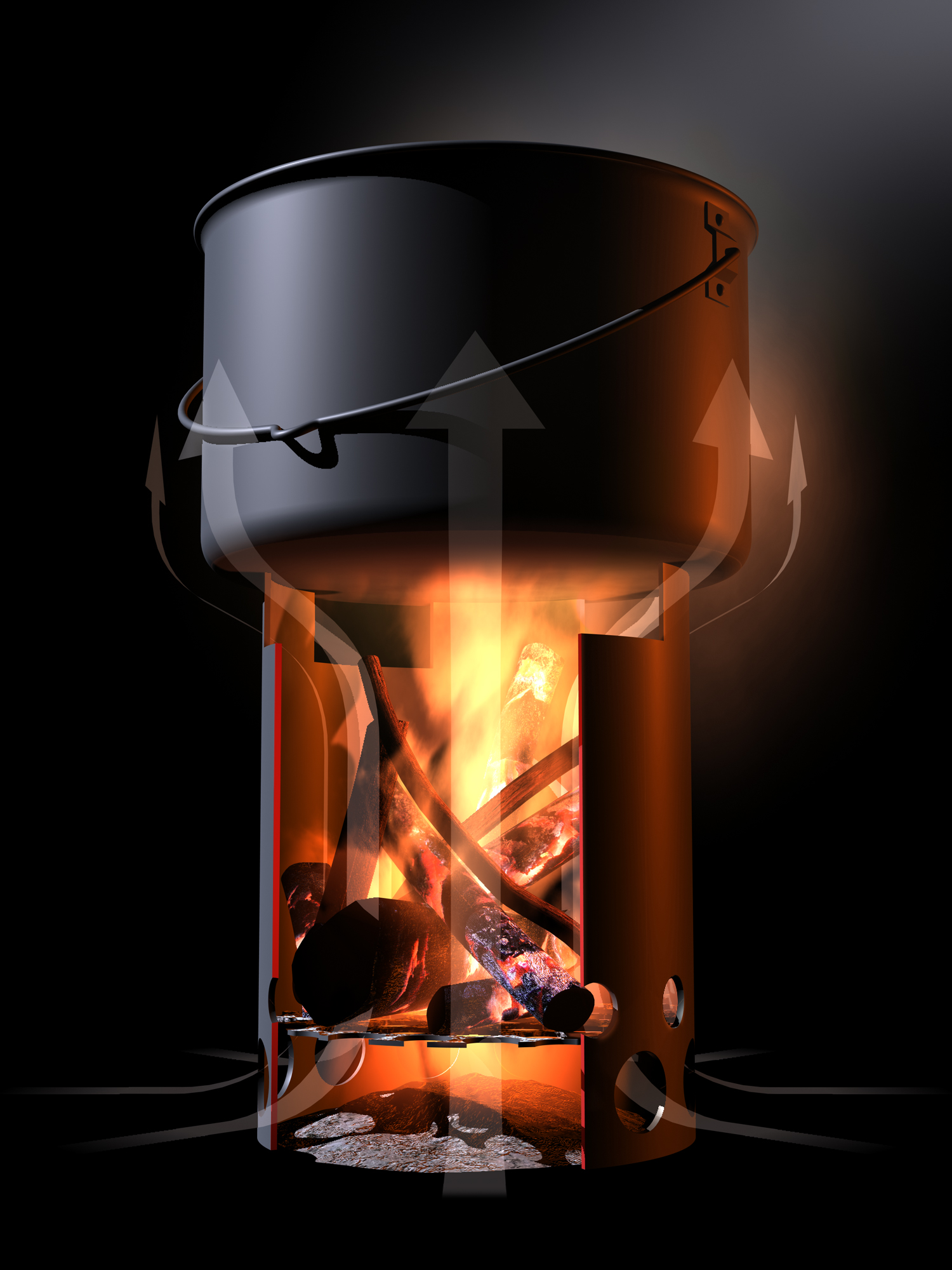
Heat convection in a hobo stove (schematic)

This stove may be built from a discarded tin can of any size by removing the top of the can, punching several small holes near the upper edge, and a larger opening on the side of the can near the bottom, for fuel and air. The bottom of the can is generally left in place, as this yields a stronger stove structure and minimizes spread of fire to combustible material on the ground. Fuel is placed in the can and ignited. Convection draws air in through the bottom/side orifice, and heat emerges from the top. A cooking vessel may be placed on the top. The bottom/side hole may face the wind for more heat or it may be partially covered with scrap metal if the fire is too hot.

The main benefit of the hobo stove is its ease of construction and versatility. The stove itself can be constructed out of a variety of materials: paint cans, coffee cans, food tins, buckets, and large drums are most often put to that purpose. Further flexibility lies in the fact that nearly anything combustible can be used as a fuel source. Typical fuels are dry twigs and small pine cones. Use of dried animal dung is also possible. Use of a Buddy Burner allows the use of such less-volatile liquid fuels as rubbing alcohol, kerosene, or wax.

=== Cautions and considerations of use ===
Some types of cans may have interior coatings containing chemicals such as Bisphenol A (BPA). Reusing containers originally holding paints and other types of chemicals may be injurious to the health of the user if the can is not properly cleaned and decontaminated.

Caution should be used when selecting fuel. While dry twigs and other natural fuels may have low risks, the use of other materials such as pressure treated lumber may lead to exposure to carcinogens of various kinds.

== See also ==
- Beverage-can stove
- Cook stove
- Kelly Kettle
- List of stoves
- Portable stove
- Rocket stove
- Solar cooker
- Swedish torch
- Tin can describing manufacturing process and use of interior coatings
