= Manifold Destiny (cookbook) =

1989 cookbook

- Author: Chris Maynard; Bill Scheller
- Language: English
- Genre: Cookbook
- Publication date: 1989
- ISBN: 0679723374

Manifold Destiny is a 1989 cookbook (ISBN 0679723374), its updated 1998 edition (ISBN 0375751408) and a 2008 update (ISBN 1416596232) on the subject of cooking on the surface of a car engine. It was written by Chris Maynard and Bill Scheller, a photographer and a travel writer who were also rally drivers.

The authors claimed inspiration from a trip from Montreal to Boston, where the authors were inspired to keep a package of smoked meat from Schwartz's in Montreal hot by placing it in a secure spot on the car's engine block, having heard that it was said to be common for truckers to keep cans of soup hot by doing the same thing.

== See also ==
- Outdoor cooking
