= Bear-resistant food storage container =

Bear-resistant food storage containers, also called bear canisters or bear cans, are usually hard-sided containers used by backpackers to protect their food from theft by bears. Bear canisters are seeing increased popularity in areas where bears have become habituated to human presence, and are required in some places, such as Yosemite National Park in the United States.

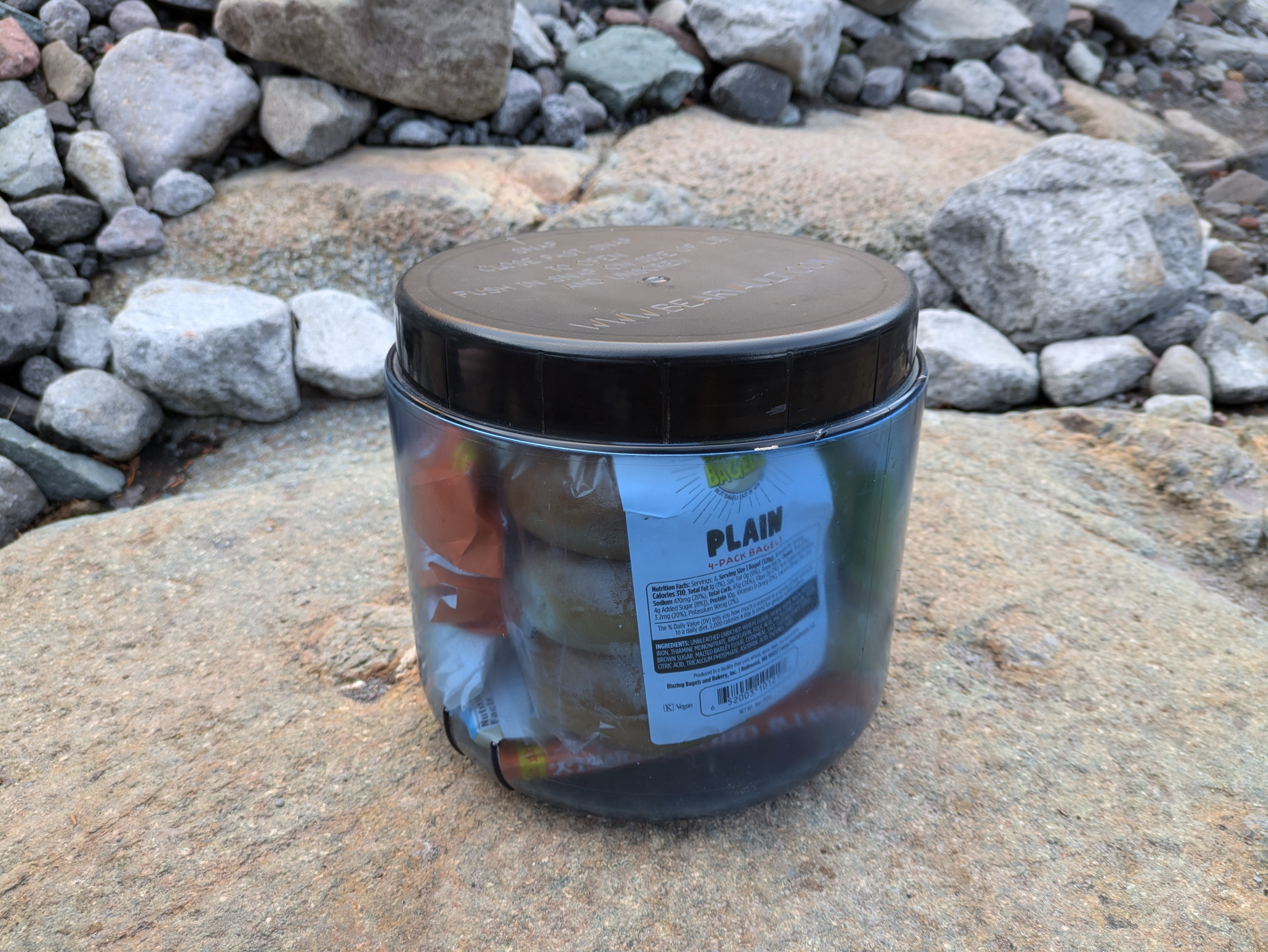
A small BearVault canister for one hiker in Mount Rainier National Park

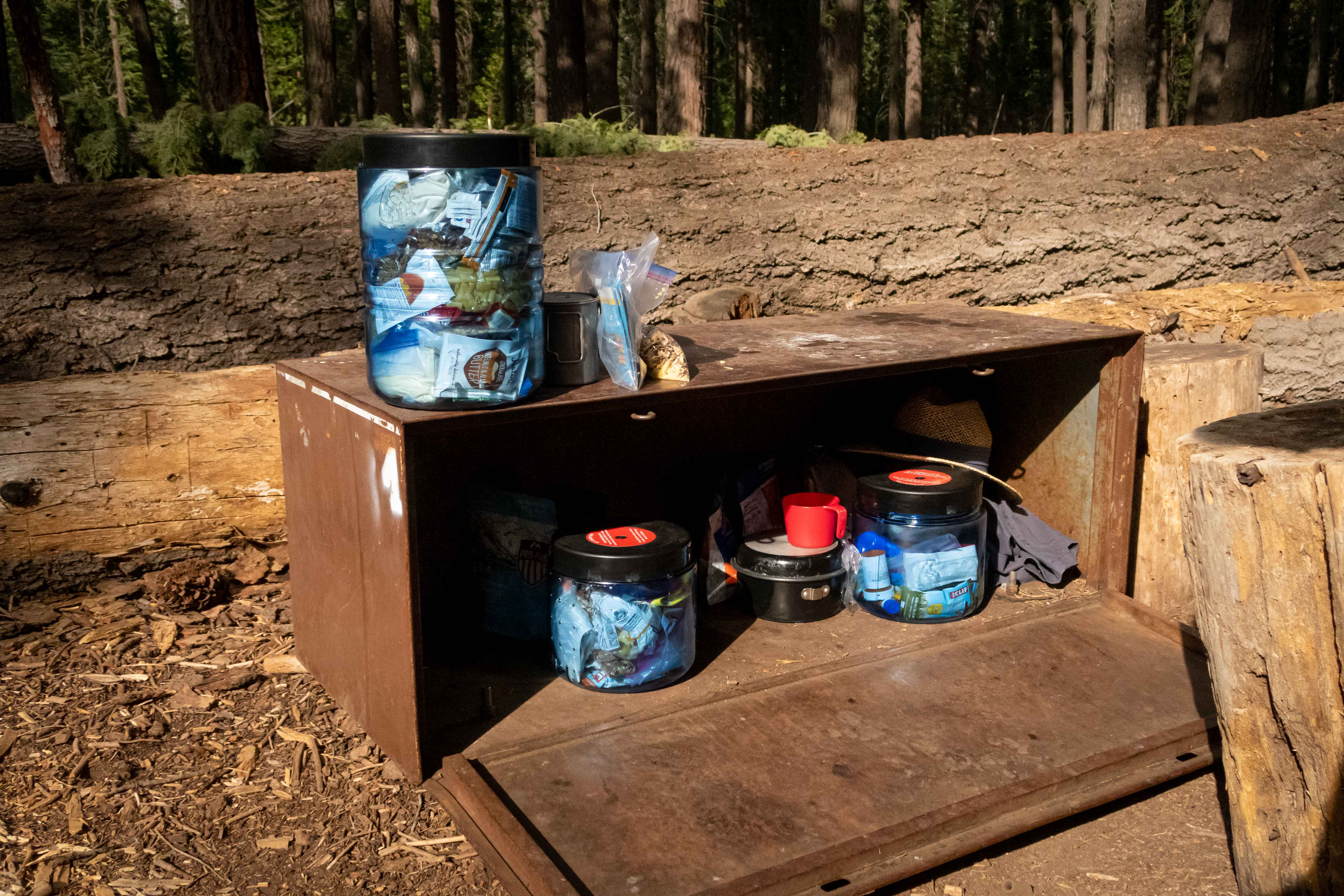
Canisters in and on a metal storage box in Yosemite National Park, California

== Construction ==
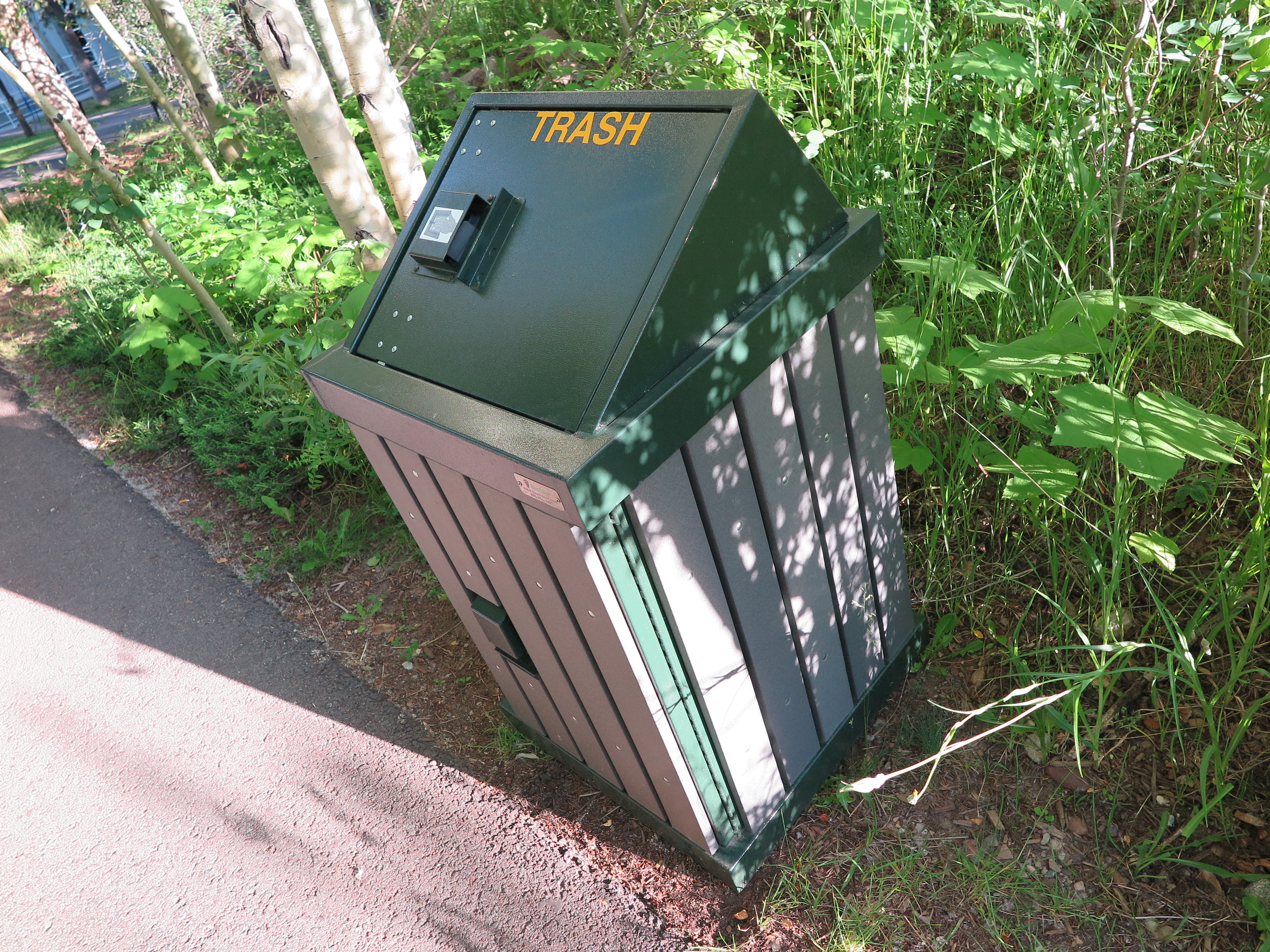
Bear-resistant trash bin may be opened only by humans, not bears.

A bear canister typically weighs between 2–4 lb (1–2 kg), and has a storage capacity of 400–900 in^{3} (6–15 liters). The actual capacity in number of days of hiking food stored varies with the appetite of the hiker, the selection of food, and the skill in which it is packed, but a 700 in^{3} canister likely holds up to a week's worth of food for the average hiker.

Hard-sided bear cans employ such materials as polycarbonate, ABS plastic, carbon fiber, and aluminum in their construction. Canisters should resist both the tremendous strength and high intelligence of an attacking animal. Most containers are too large for a bear to simply pick up and carry away.

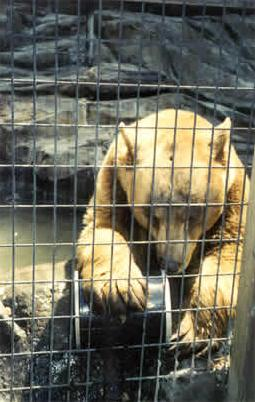
A captive bear attempting to open a bear canister

The lid of a canister is usually recessed in order to prevent it being pried off. Some manufacturers require a tool such as a coin to open the canister while others use locking nubs that allow the user to twist the lid off without tools.

== Regulations and testing ==
Several national parks and national forests require backcountry visitors to carry approved food storage containers. Backpackers who ignore this policy may face fines, property impounded, or eviction from the wilderness. Rangers may stop hikers and require them to produce their containers for inspection.

The Sierra Interagency Black Bear Group (SIBBG) and the Interagency Grizzly Bear Committee (IGBC) regulate the approval of food storage containers in parts of the western United States. Containers effective against the American black bears in the Sierra Nevada may not be effective against the grizzly bears found elsewhere. SIBBG conducts visual inspection and various structural tests, then containers are filled with food and left in the cages of captive black bears in a zoo in California. If the canister survives the zoo test, it is then conditionally approved. Full approval is only given after three months' successful field tests by users.

The (IGBC) first conducts a visual inspection to identify products that may be harmful to humans or the captive test bears. Next, food such as peanut butter, fish, or other attractant will be placed inside the container. This container will then be put in the grizzly bear enclosure at The Grizzly & Wolf Discovery Center in West Yellowstone Montana. To pass the IGBC certification, a bear must have a total of one hour of direct contact with the product, not counting licking. The product must remain functional and have no penetrations larger than 1/4 inch.

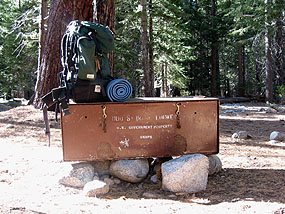
A stationary steel food storage box at a campsite. Popular destinations equipped with these enable backpackers to do without a bear canister.

It is recommended that canisters be left on the ground, at least 100 feet/30 metres from the campsite. Suspending the canister can allow the bear to smash it to the ground or use the suspension gear to carry it away. Most canisters are designed to resist clawing and biting from bears rather than loaded drops from trees or cliffs. To prevent a bear from rolling it away, a hiker can leave the container in a bush, a shallow depression, or wedged between rocks or logs. Placing the canister near water could allow the container to float away. Reflective tape and labelling the container helps in recovery.

== Bear bagging ==
An alternative is bear bagging, also called bear hanging or bear hangs, wherein items attractive to a bear such as food, toiletries, or other scented items are placed in a bag and then raised into the air with a rope — out of its reach. The rationale is that bears, being unable to reach the food, are less drawn to campsites and pose less of a threat to campers and their equipment.

Often this is done by tying another length of rope tightly between two trees or other tall objects. A bear bag should be at least 15 feet (4.5 m) high and 10 feet (3 m) from any vertical support. The counterbalance method, Marrison system, and Pacific Crest Trail method are a few different techniques to use when hanging a bear bag.

In alpine environments there are often not sufficient trees and smaller trees have been damaged by ropes rubbing over bark. Bear bagging can also be dangerous and resulted in a camper's death in 2011. Bears are also effective climbers who climb trees to retrieve hung food or bite through ropes.

In areas where bears pose severe problems, such as a majority of Yosemite National Park, bear bagging is ineffective and has been banned.

== Product failure ==
Yellow-Yellow, a wild 125-pound black bear in the Adirondacks near North Elba, New York, figured out how to open several models of polypropylene and polycarbonate bear canisters. Yellow-Yellow was killed by a hunter in the fall of 2012.
