= Bark pot =

A bark pot is the vernacular name of a vessel in Newfoundland English, used to hold an infusion of tree bark in which fishers would dip nets, cod traps, lines, or sails to preserve them. It was an integral piece of technology for the early inshore cod fishery of Newfoundland and Labrador. It was also the term used for a vessel used to make a solution of bark for tanning leather. Also known as a barking kettle, barking pot, or tan pot, it was often made of iron or copper.

== Etymology ==
The word bark to refer to the harder outer covering of trees dates back to the 1300s and likely comes from the Old Norse börkr, and the Proto-Germanic *barkuz which is most likely related to birch trees. The use of bark as a verb meaning ‘"to strip off the bark (of a tree)" sees its first recorded use in the 1540s. Both the noun and verb form of bark as it relates the processing of fishing nets in Newfoundland was documented by Rev. George Patterson in 1895.

== Use in Newfoundland and Labrador fishery ==
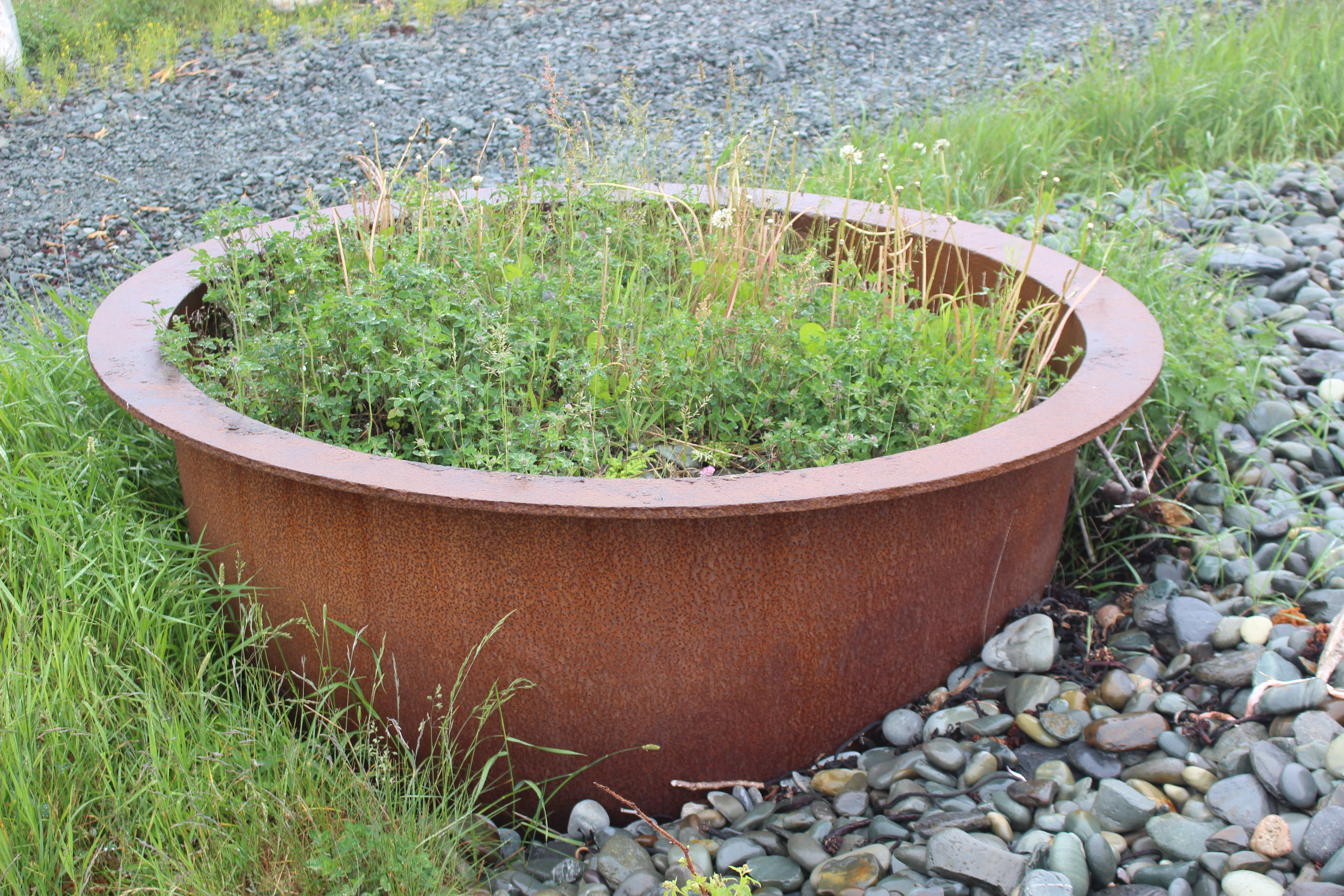
Bark pot on the beach at Ferryland, Newfoundland, in July 2020.

Fishing nets, cod traps, and sails would be dipped into a barking pot filled with a solution of bark and other materials. The use of bark mixtures for the preservation of nets was brought over by English migrant fishermen during the 17th century; Aaron Thomas described the vessel used for making this bark mixture in his 1794-1795 journal of a voyage from England to Newfoundland and back to England:

In every Harbour, Creek and Cove there is what may be called a Parish Pott, this holds about 20 Gallons, and it is filled with Water and Spruce Bark, which is boiled together; they then dip the netts of the Fishermen into it, and the Sails of their Boats to which it is a great preservation. This Pott is generally the property of one person, and it is seldom that you will find more than one of these Potts in a Creek or Cove. For dipping a set of Boat Sails they pay 3/6d. I am told the Owners have made Fifteen Pounds in one season by Dipping! This is all clear profit, the Bark and firing not costing anything. I mention this circumstance of dipping to show in this particular the property of the Spruce Tree.

Traditional bark pots were used on beaches to preserve nets and fishing gear. Barking pots were described as resembling a witch's cauldron, while later workers used a kerosene drum which was cut in half; a flour barrel tub, puncheon, or piggin would be used for dipping out the bark solution. The process of barking was described by A.F. O'Brien of Cape Broyle, circa 1964;

When the trap has been mended, it must be barked. The trap is boiled to help preserve the twine. Usually two large oil drums are set up in a fireplace on the beach. Bark is dumped into each drum and then they are filled with salt water. Then the fire is lit and the mixture is boiled. The different parts of the trap are put into large 'punchins' and the bark poured over them. When each punchin is filled, they are covered with a sawed-off punchin and allowed to work for a day or so. The trap is then taken and spread on the wharf to dry.

The barking of fishing nets and other gear was done to preserve it from corrosion in the sea. When barked with a combination of ochre and cod liver oil, sails would become waterproof, but not stiff and heavy, making them suitable for storms, and other inclement weather. Cod traps and nets were also barked in these pots, which not only preserved them, but made them less obvious to fish in the water.

By mid-century, the barking of nets, sails, or cod traps was no longer necessary, as it became possible to buy these products already treated and made with materials which ensured a practically unlimited life span.

== Leather-work and contemporary craft ==
Running parallel to the practice of barking nets, sails, and canvas was the practice of using barking pots and barking solutions to tan hides into usable leather. In Newfoundland and Labrador, barking pots were used to make sealskin boots on the Great Northern Peninsula. The sealskin boot tradition was likely adopted by the settler community through marriages between migrant fishermen and Labrador Inuit women. The boots are similar to traditional Inuit sealskin boots, but have been barked in a manner similar to settler traditions. Some practitioners were working with these traditions as of 2020 and using large garbage cans and other containers in lieu of the traditional barking pot. Contemporary craft producers such as those with the Labrador Artisans Co-operative have developed products which showcase the tradition of barking using innovative materials and techniques. Barking was identified as a craft at risk in the province in 2021, and selected as a skill to receive funding under a craft mentor and apprentice program in 2022.
