= Launder =

Launder or Launders may refer to:

- Launder (surname)
- Launders (surname)

== See also ==
- Laundering (disambiguation), several types of washing, literally or metaphorically
