= Memphis Italian Festival =

Cultural event in Memphis, Tennessee

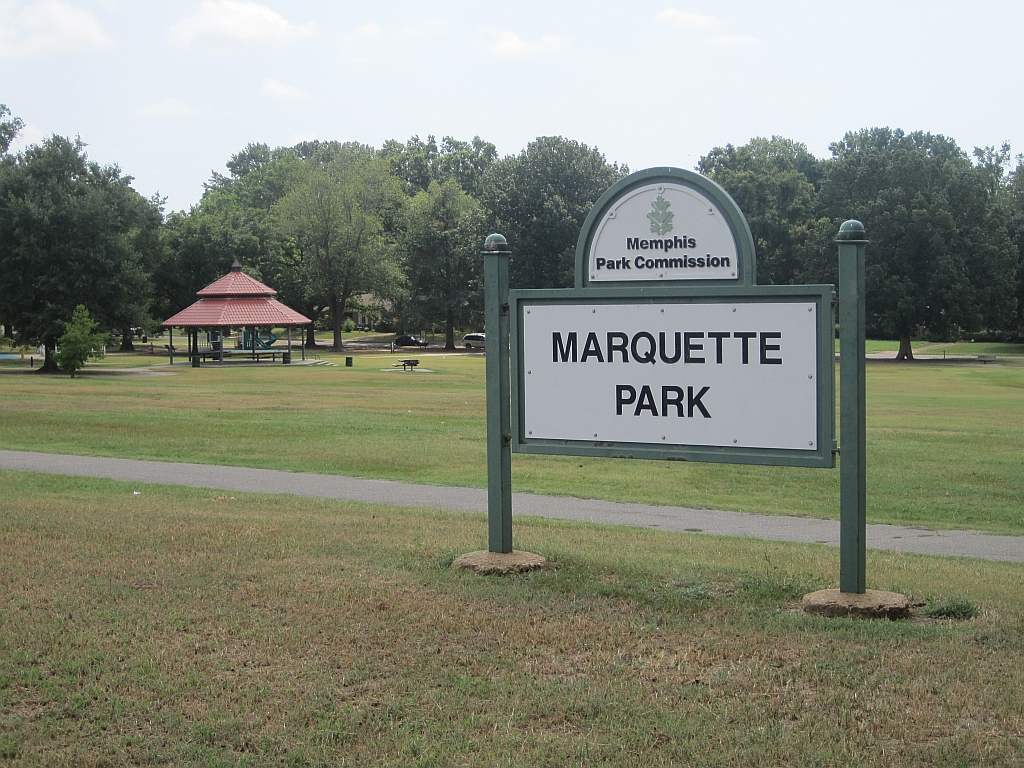
Marquette Park in Memphis, Tennessee

The Memphis Italian Festival is an annual event in Memphis, Tennessee held on the weekend after Memorial Day.

== Background ==
Since 1989, the festival has been held in Memphis's Marquette Park, the weekend after Memorial Day. The festival celebrates Italian-American traditions and culture, especially that of the Mid-South. Attendees enjoy cultural activities and Italian-American food. The event's proceeds are given directly to children attending the Holy Rosary Parish School, a Catholic elementary school in Memphis.

Due to the COVID-19 pandemic, the festival was not held in 2020.

== Activities ==
The festival hosts musical performances from both local and national bands. Other forms of entertainment include bocce ball tournaments, a volleyball tournament, carnival games, grape stomping, and arts and crafts. Competitions are held for the best gravy and the best homemade wine. Competitions are also held for the best booth and the best powder room.

== See also ==
- Memphis in May
