= Washing (disambiguation) =

Washing is a method of cleaning.

Washing may also refer to:

- Check washing, the process of erasing details from checks to allow them to be rewritten
- Greenwashing, a form of marketing spin about environmental friendliness
- Humanewashing, making misleading claims around animal welfare
- Washing (photography), an important part of all film processing and printmaking processes
- Whitewashing (censorship), a metaphor about covering over errors or bad actions

== See also ==
- Laundering (disambiguation)
