= List of laundry topics =

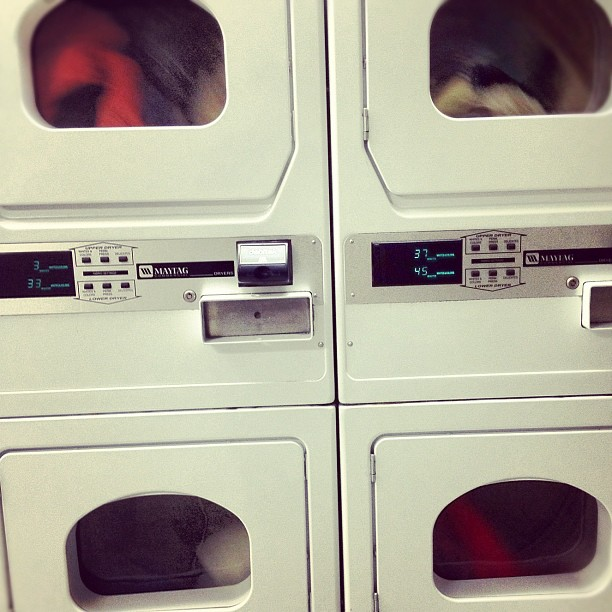
Maytag commercial clothes dryers

This is a list of laundry topics. Laundry is the washing of clothing and linens (e.g. sheets and towels). Laundry processes are often done in a business, room or area in a home or apartment building, reserved for that purpose; this is referred to as a laundry room. The material that is being washed, or has been laundered, is also generally referred to as laundry.

== Laundry topics ==
=== Chemicals ===
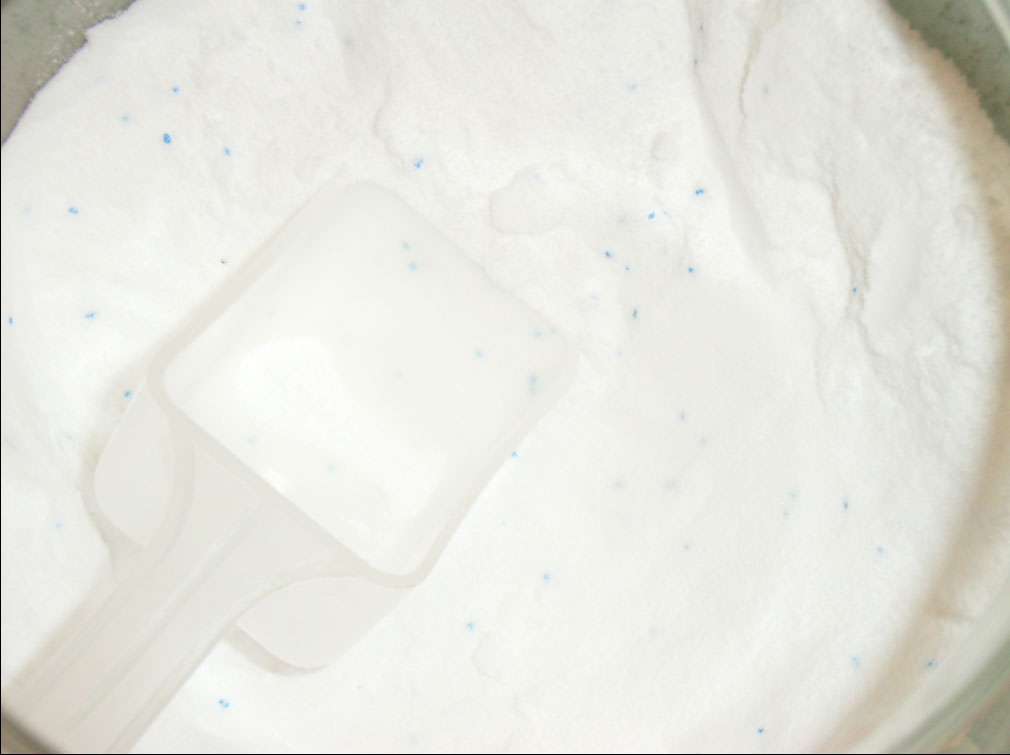
Laundry detergent powder

- Biological detergent – laundry detergent that contains enzymes harvested from micro-organisms such as bacteria adapted to live in hot springs. The description is commonly used in the United Kingdom.
- Bleach
- Fabric softener
- Laundry detergent

=== Washing ===
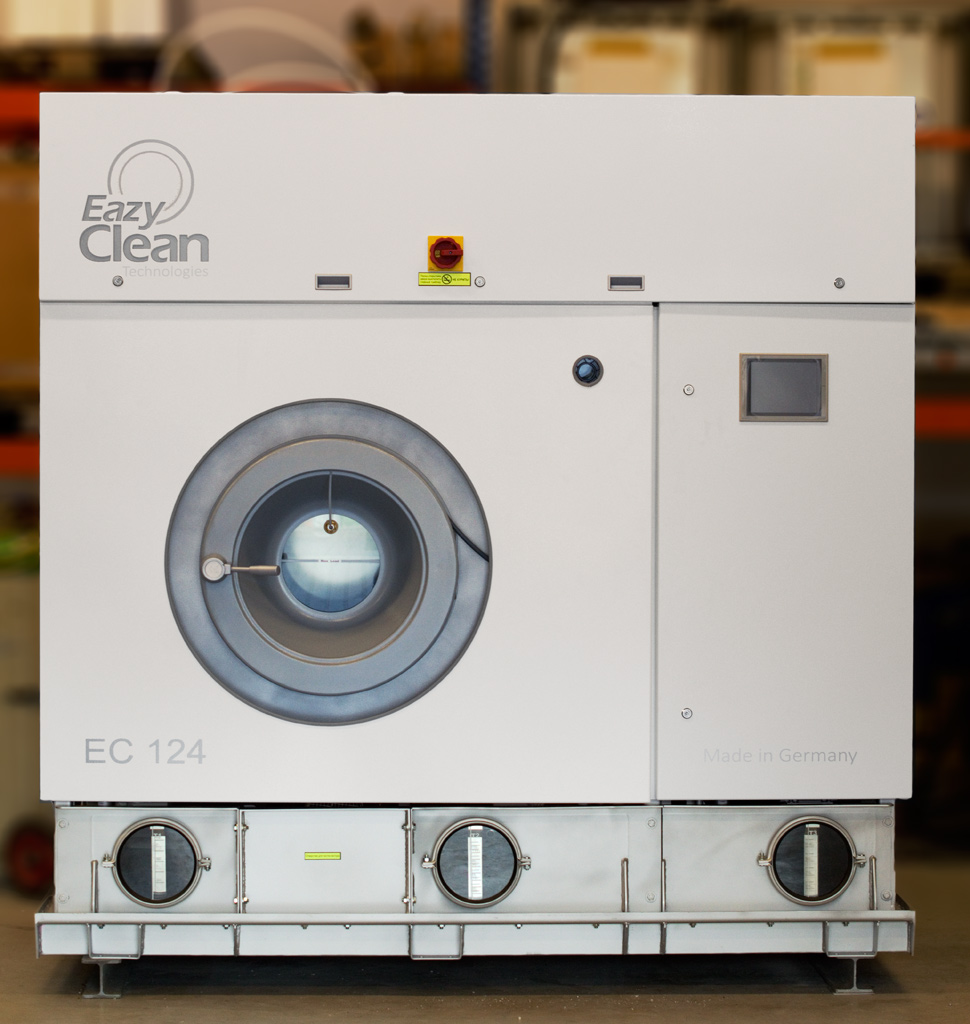
A modern dry cleaning machine with touchscreen and SPS control, manufacturer EazyClean, type EC124, photo taken prior to installation

- Combo washer dryer
- Dry cleaning
- Posser or washing dolly, a tool for agitating the wet fabric
- Washboard and washing paddle, also known under many other names
- Wash copper, a portable or built-in boiler
- Washing machine
- Wet cleaning, a retronym meaning "not dry cleaning"

=== Drying ===
Modern hanging clothes horse with pulley system

- Airing cupboard
- Clothes dryer
- Clothes horse or drying rack or many other names
- Clothes line
- Drying cabinet
- Hills Hoist
- Kitchen maid (pulley airer)
- Mangle (machine)
- Sheila Maid
- Winter Dyke

=== Finishing ===
- Box mangle
- Fluff and Fold, a service provided by commercial laundrettes
- Ironing
- Tunnel finisher

=== Industrial ===
- Industrial laundry
  - Tunnel washer
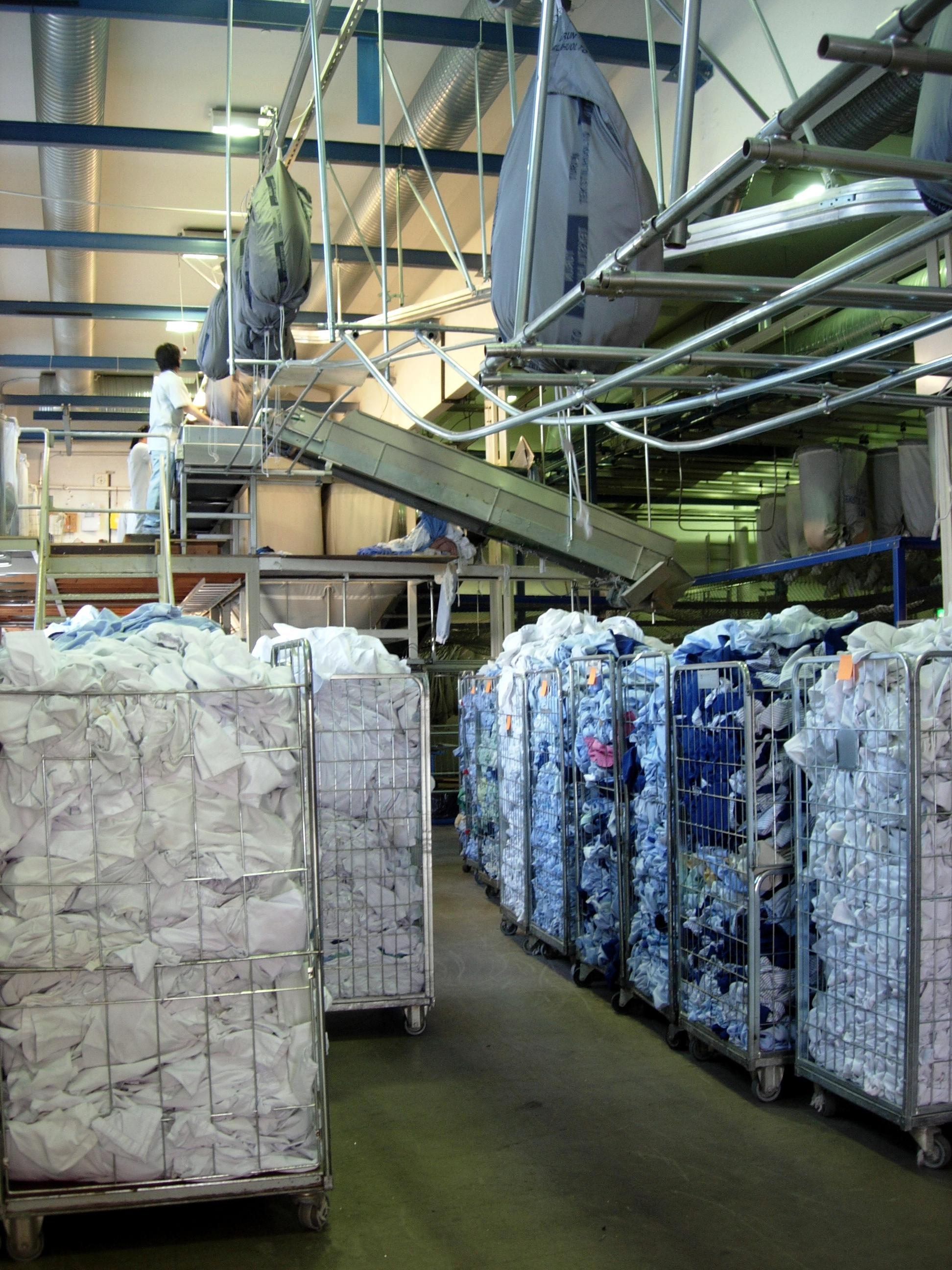
Industrial laundry sorting

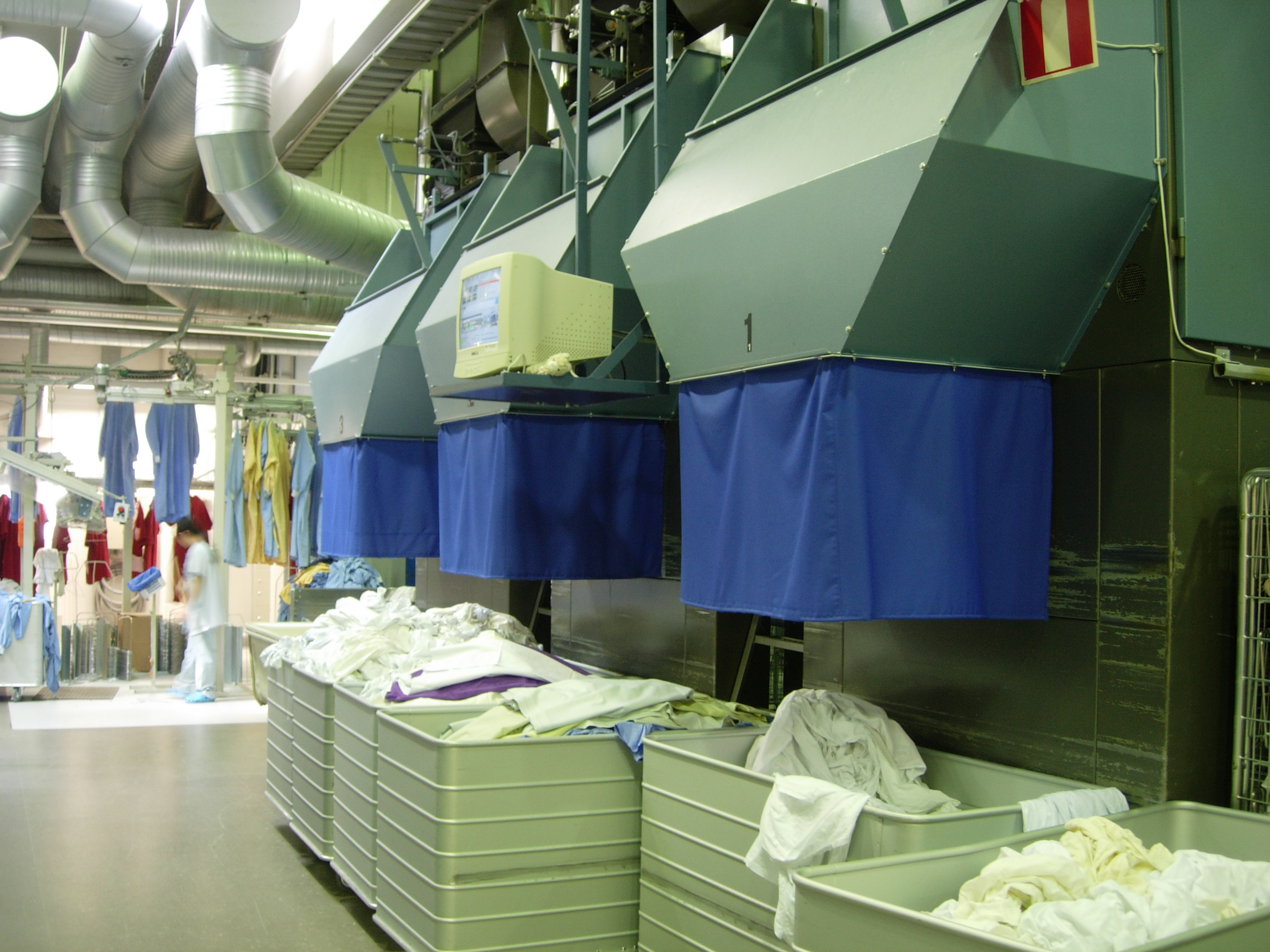
The unloading side of a dryer in an industrial laundry which dries the linen

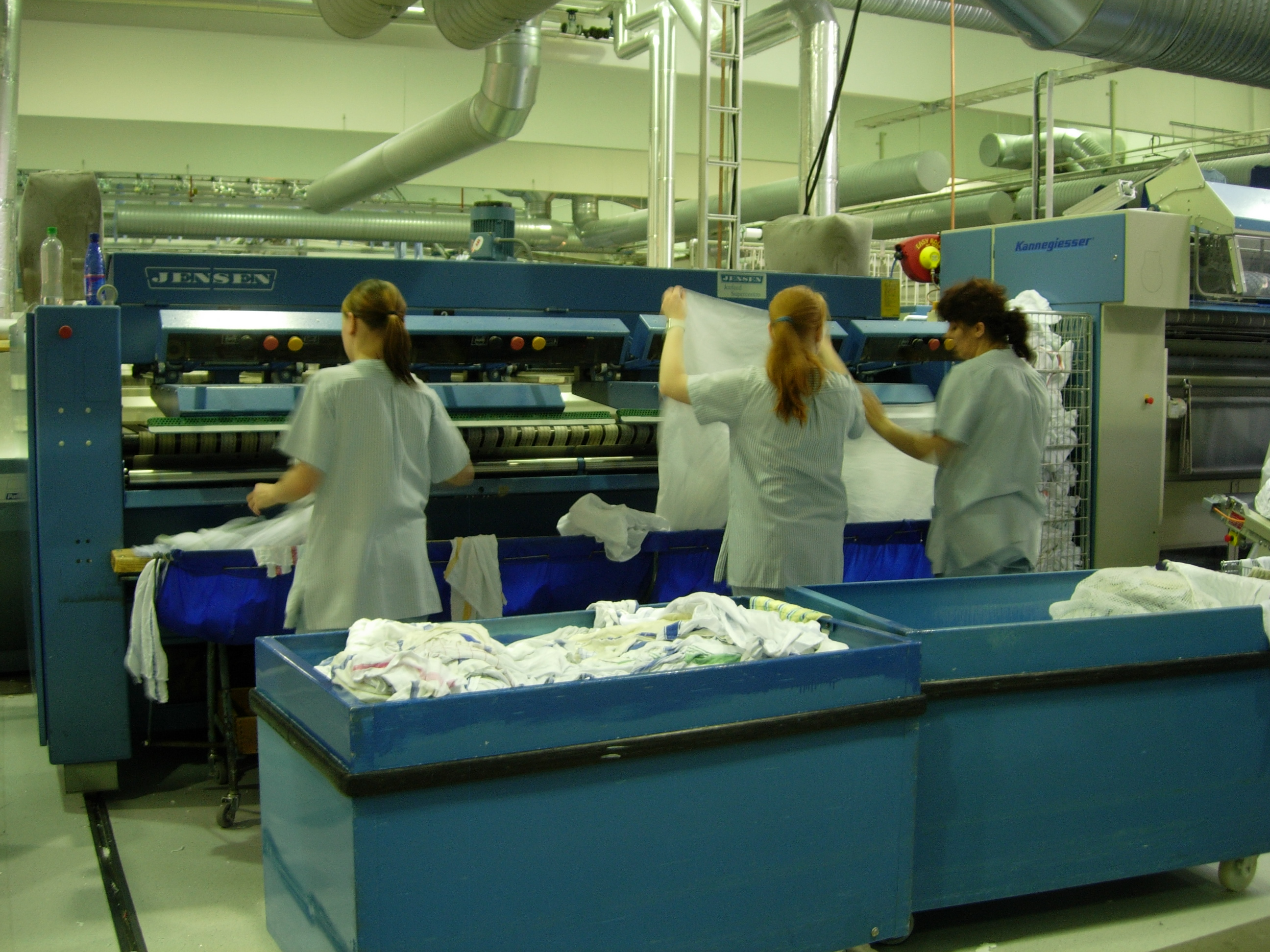
A feeder where linen is placed and which takes the linen to the ironer and folder

=== Concepts ===
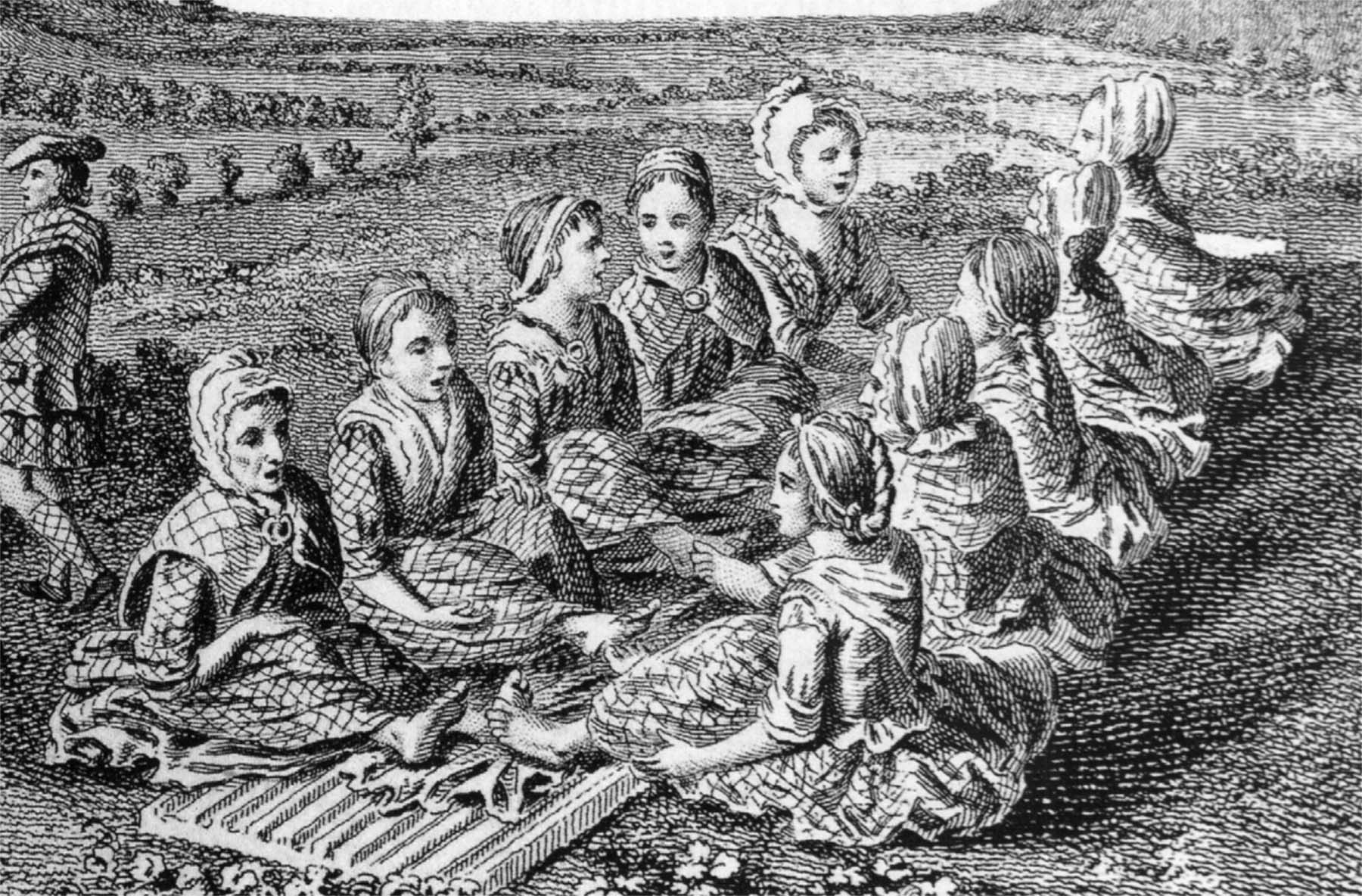
Engraving of Scotswomen singing a waulking song while waulking or fulling cloth, c. 1770.

Some of these relate more to textile manufacturing than laundry, but there is overlap in how wet cloth is processed.

- Color fastness, the degree to which a textile retains its color without fading or bleeding
- Fulling – a step in making woollen cloth - cleaning the fleece to eliminate oils, dirt, and other impurities, and making it thicker.
- Posting, trampling or treading wet clothing
- Shrinkage
- Stain

=== Organizations ===
- Dry Cleaning and Laundry International
- Dry Cleaning Institute of Australia
- Chinese Hand Laundry Alliance
- Laundry and Dry Cleaning International Union
- Laundry Workers Industrial Union
- Magdalene asylum
- Project Laundry List – a New Hampshire group that encourages the outdoor drying of clothes
- Worshipful Company of Launderers – a livery company in the City of London that promotes the profession of the launderers by awarding scholarships to laundry students.

=== Companies ===
- 5àsec - a French franchise network
- Washio (company) - defunct laundry delivery service
- SudShare - an American app-based laundry cleaning and delivery company

=== Culture ===
- Dadeumi, the traditional Korean practice of rhythmically beating cloth, associated with the hardships of a woman's life
- Dhobiwallah, or dhobi, the washermen in South Central Asia (India, Pakistan, Sri Lanka, etc.), and their caste group, historically associated with washing clothes
- Fullo, the Latin word for a person washing laundry
- Washerwoman or laundress
- Housekeeping
- Laundry symbols

=== Accessories ===
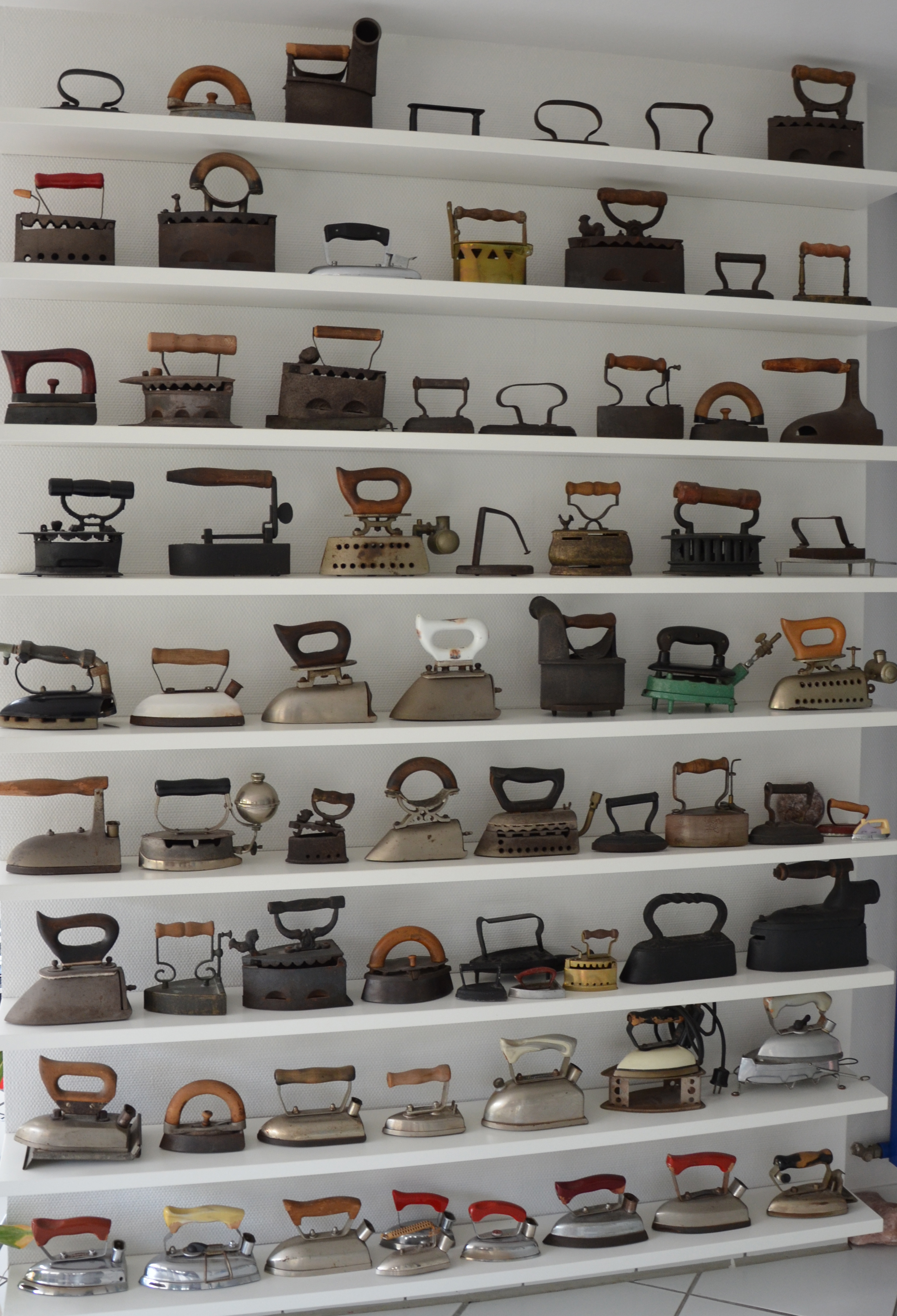
A collection of irons

- Clothes hanger
- Clothes iron
- Clothespin
- Dispensing ball
- Dryer ball
- Hamper
- Laundry ball
- Laundry basket

=== Law ===
- Barbier v. Connolly
- Kimball Laundry Co. v. United States
- Muller v. Oregon
- Pearson v. Chung
- Yick Wo v. Hopkins

=== Places ===
- Baths and wash houses in Britain, public places that included facilities for washing the body as well as clothes
- Dhobi ghat, any open-air washing-place in southern central Asia
- Mahalaxmi Dhobi Ghat, a well-known open air laundry in Mumbai, India.
- Laundry room, in a private dwelling
- Lavoir, a public open-air wash-house in a village
- Self-service laundry, also known as a coin wash, laundromat, washeteria, laundrette
- Tvättstuga, a shared laundry room in a hall of residence or block of flats
- Utility room, in a private dwelling that includes laundry functions
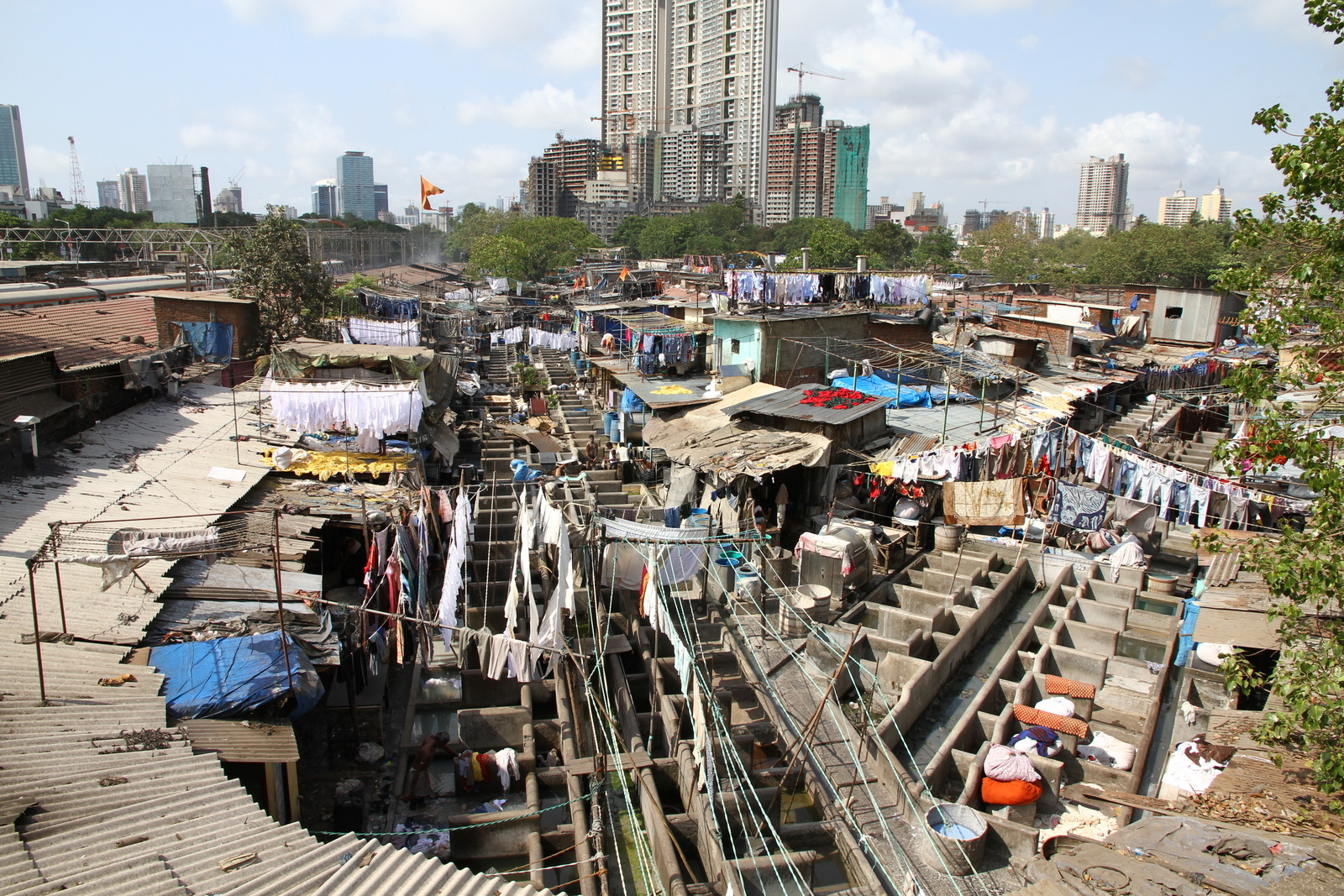
The Mahalaxmi Dhobi Ghat open air laundry in Mumbai

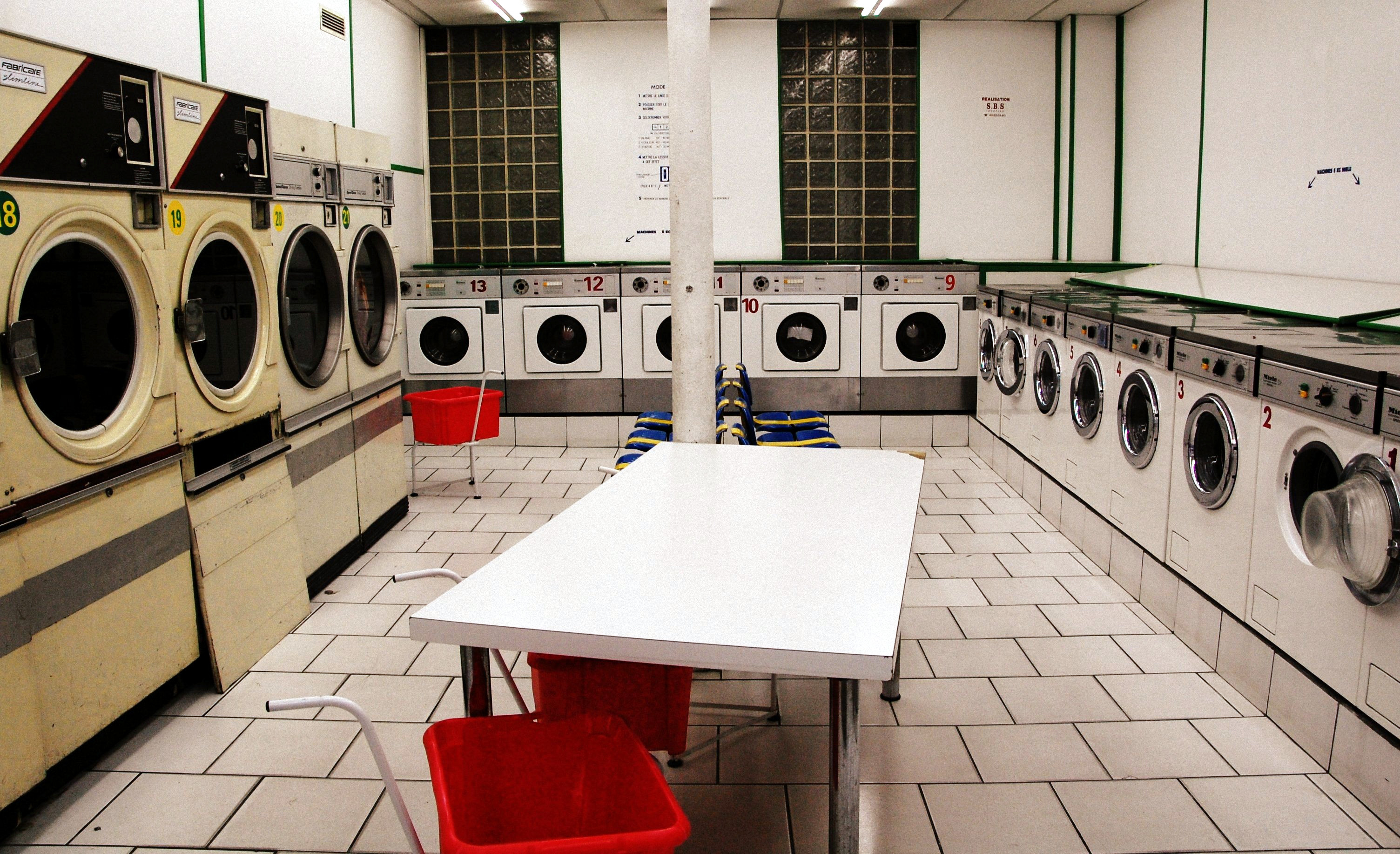
A self-service laundry in Paris
