= Laundering =

Laundering may refer to:

- Money laundering, disguising the origin of illegally gained wealth
- Information laundering, propaganda tactic
- Doing laundry, or washing clothes
- Child laundering, the illegal acquisition of children through monetary transactions, etc.
- Policy laundering, disguising the origin of legislation
- Data laundering, disguising the origin of stolen data

== See also ==
- List of laundry articles
