= Dimensional stability (fabric) =

Fabric quality assessment parameter

Dimensional stability (in fabric) is a fabric's ability to maintain its initial size and shape even after undergoing wear and care, which is a desirable property. Textile manufacturing is based on the conversion of fiber into yarn, yarn into fabric, includes spinning, weaving, or knitting, etc., and the fabric passes through many inevitable changes and mechanical forces during this journey. When the products are immersed in water, the water acts as a relaxing medium, all the stresses and strains are relaxed, and the fabric tries to come back to its original state.

The more dimensionally stable a fabric is, the less it is subject to shrinkage. Shrinkage is the change of dimensions in textile products when they are washed (usually in hot water) or relaxed. The change is always expressed relative to the dimensions before the exposure of washing or relaxing. Shrinkage is also called residual shrinkage and measured in percentage. The major cause of shrinkage is the release of stresses and strains introduced in manufacturing processes.

== Significance ==
The dimensional stability of textile materials is an important quality parameter. Failing and unstable materials can cause deforming of the garments or products. Shrinkage is tested at various stages, but most importantly before cutting the fabric into further sewn products and after cutting and sewing prior to supplying the products to buyers and consumers. It is a required parameter of quality control to ensure the sizes of the products to avoid any complaints regarding deformation or change in dimensions after domestic laundry. The tests are conducted with provided specifications of buyers imitating the same conditions like washing cycle time, temperature and water ratio and fabric load and sometimes top loading and front loading washing machines are chosen to authenticate the test and assurance of the results. This procedure provides standard and alternate home laundering conditions using an automatic washing machine. While the procedure includes several options, it is not possible to include every existing combination of laundering parameters. The test is applicable to all fabrics and end products suitable for home laundering.

Shrinkage has great significance because any expansion or shrinkage can cause deformation of the product, which could be a severe concern for the end-user, and the brand can lose its reputation. Secondly, in the garment-making industry, consumption of the fabric is calculated in yards, so any variance outside permissible limits is unacceptable. Preshrunk fabrics and garments are also available.

== Types of shrinkage ==
Shrinkage is a change in dimensions across the length and width of the fabric after washing, usage, and when exposed to the relaxing of fabrics. Mainly shrinkage is of two types. One is minus shrinkage and the other is plus shrinkage. Skew (twisting of the vertical grains) is also observed along with shrinkage. Abnormal twisting is also considered as a non-conformity.

1. Contraction: Any noticeable decrease in dimensions is known as Contraction (minus) shrinkage.
2. Expansion: Any noticeable increase or expansion in dimension is known as Expansion (plus) shrinkage.

== Causes ==
- Composition and properties

Composition and content determine the type and percentage of fibres. Natural fibres shrink more than synthetic fibres. Synthetic fibres are more stable due to their crystalline and thermoplastic nature. They do not shrink, whereas natural fibres are more prone to shrink because of more amorphous regions in their fibre structure which allows more absorption of water, swelling of fibres and increased lubricity increase the shrinking tendency. Blended fabrics normally synthetic and natural are also considered more stable.

- Structure of the fabric

The textile products which are loosely woven or knitted are prone to shrink more and tightly knitted and woven products are more stable. In knitted fabrics the structure is competitively loose and flexible. Knitting structures are constructed by interlocking the loops. Whereas in weaving yarns are interlaced at right angles to form a stable fabric.

- Finishing applications and procedures

Fibers to fabric conversion lead to many mechanical tensions and forces during manufacturing, which includes following steps for fibre to yarn conversion with spinning then fabric with weaving, and knitting. When the products are immersed in water, the water acts as a relaxing medium and all stresses and strains get relaxed and try to come back to its original relaxed state. Even after finishing with sophisticated finishing machines, some residual shrinkage remains, which is carried forward to the garment stage. This residual shrinkage may cause deformity or de-shaping of the products after domestic laundry. There are certain acceptance limits of shrinkage levels for every product. Abnormal shrinkage levels are considered a non-conformity to quality standards.

== Test methods ==
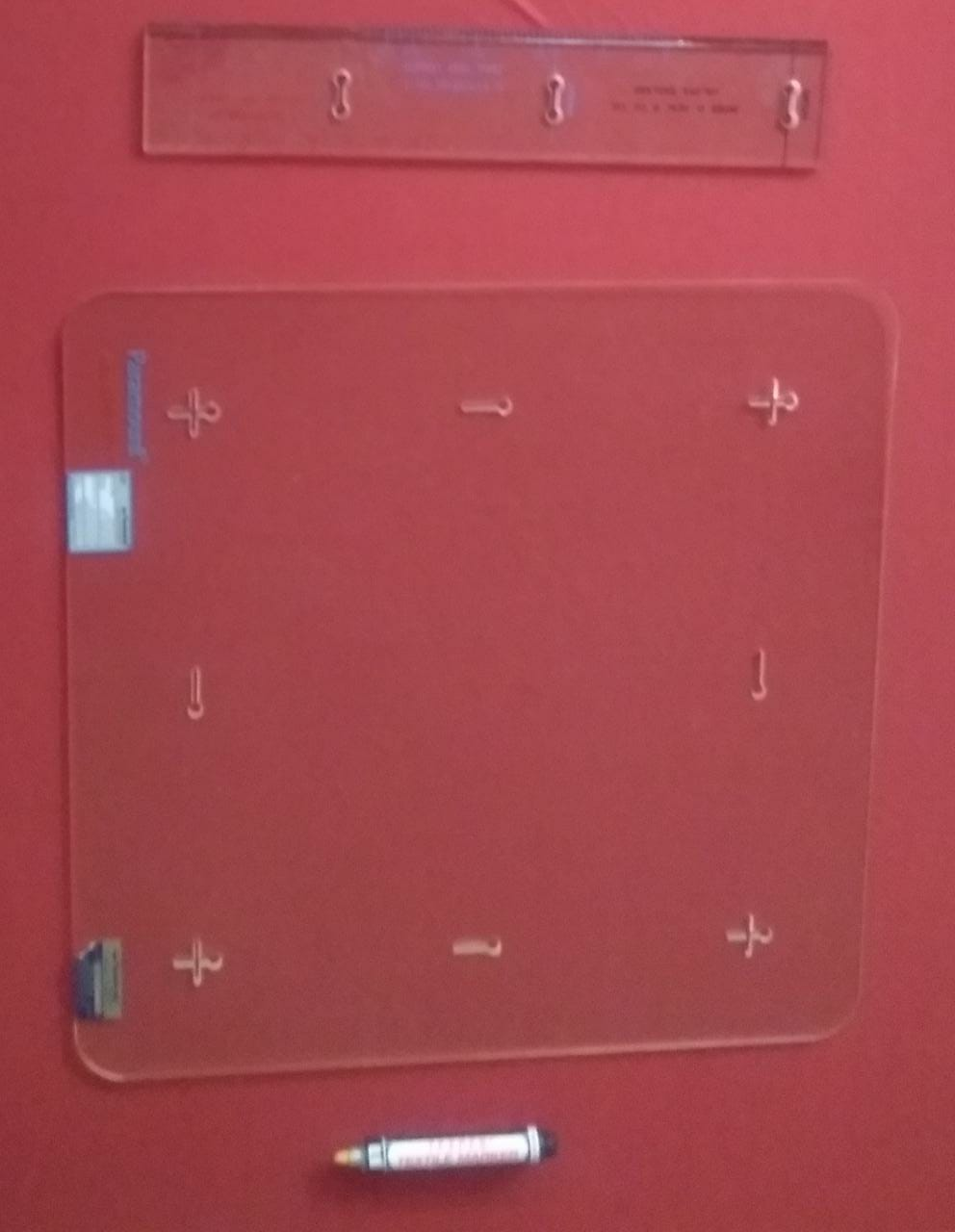
Shrinkage measuring template, scale and mark

The different test methods are used as per the final destination of the product (Europe, U.S.A., etc.) and the expected washing or laundry methods in practice. I.S.O. and AATCC standards are used for shrinkage testing. There are few brands which are customizing the test method as per their quality norms. Some test methods include:

- AATCC Test Method 135
- AATCC Test Method 150
- ISO 6330
- CAN/CGSB 58

== Shrinkage resistance and preshrinking ==
Shrinkage resistance is the term used to describe the ability of a fabric to retain its initial dimensions after undergoing the shrinkage process. This quality is closely tied to how the fabric reacts to moisture or heat. Fabrics that shrink during laundering or after exposure to heat may lose their aesthetic appeal and may not be suitable for their intended purpose. Residual shrinkage pertains to any further shrinking that may occur after the initial care cycle.

Preshrinking is a process in which fabric is intentionally shrunk before it is cut and sewn into a garment or other textile product. Manufacturers use the term "pre-shrunk" to describe fabric or garments that have undergone processing, which is expected to limit shrinkage to less than 3% in either direction during standard wash tests or laundering. Woolen fabrics have a natural tendency to shrink, which can lead to deformation in the final garments. To prevent this, the London shrunk process was applied to specific woolen materials in the 18th century, resulting in fabrics with enhanced dimensional stability and improved resistance to shrinkage.

== Shrinkage controlling methods ==
There are various physical and chemical methods to minimize the residual shrinkage of the fabrics.

- Starting with the right selection of yarn count or denier to achieve a particular GSM (Grams per square meters)
- Appropriate loop or weaves density/tightness factor of loops (which is called loop length)
- Chemical treatments like mercerizing of cotton
- Resination of cotton in case of woven materials
- Heat setting, Pre-heat-setting and post-heat setting of synthetic and blended fabrics
- Finishing on machines like sanforizing
- For wool garments, shrinkage is due to scales on the fibers which heat, water, and agitation cause to stick together. Other fabrics are stretched by mechanical forces during production and can shrink slightly when heated though to a lesser degree than wool. Some clothes are shrunk in the factory to avoid this problem.
- Wash care label is like a manual of the garment, customers should refer to the wash care instructions before putting their clothes in washing. The wash care label infers about handling the garment such as washing, drying (tumble or line dry), and ironing. Sometimes expensive and sensitive clothes may require dry clean to avoid shrinkage and any kind of distortions.

== See also ==
- Finishing (textiles)
- List of laundry topics
