= Tunnel washer =

Industrial washing machine

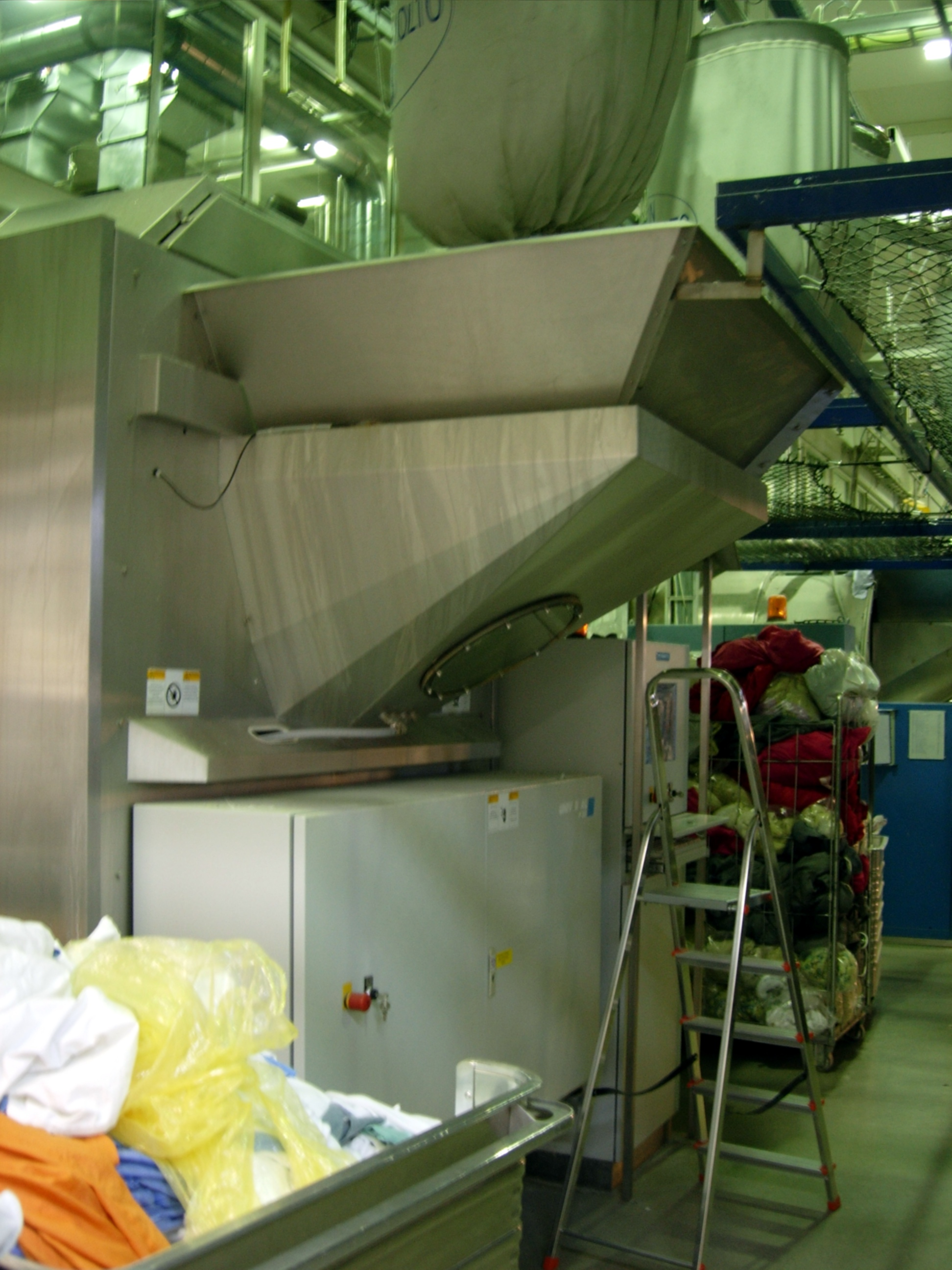
Part of a tunnel washer where linen is introduced

A tunnel washer, also called a continuous batch washer, is an industrial washing machine designed specifically to handle heavy loads of laundry.

The screw is made of perforated metal, so items can progress through the washer in one direction, while water and washing chemicals move through in the opposite direction. Thus, the linen moves through pockets of progressively cleaner water and fresher chemicals. Soiled linen can be continuously fed into one end of the tunnel while clean linen emerges from the other.

Originally, one of the machine's major drawbacks was the necessity of using one wash formula for all items. Modern computerized tunnel washers can monitor and adjust the chemical levels in individual pockets, effectively overcoming this problem.

== See also ==
- Washing machine
