= Posting (laundering process) =

Posting or postadh (Scottish Gaelic) is a term formerly used in Scotland for a process in washing clothes. It means to trample with the feet, or the act of trampling or treading. In scouring woollen clothing, blankets or coarse linen, when the strength of the arms and manual friction are found insufficient, Highland women put them in a tub with a prop – or quantity of water, then, with petticoats tucked up, they began to "post", which they continued until every part of the clothes received an effectual cleansing. When three women were employed, one usually tramped in the middle, and the other two tramped around her. Treading cloth with the feet, a time-consuming and laborious practice, has long been superseded by mechanical methods, starting in the Industrial Revolution.

There is some overlap with the process of making cloth, in that both involve textiles immersed in water. The processing of woollen cloth, known in English as fulling or tucking, was "waulking" in Scots, hence the waulking songs that the women sang as they worked.

== See also ==
- List of laundry topics
- Grape treading, which used to be a step in the process of making wine, using the feet to crush the fruit
- Washerwoman
