= Launder (surname) =

Launder is a surname. Notable people with the surname include:

- Brian Launder (born 1939), English Professor of Mechanical Engineering
- Dimitri Launder, British artist
- Frank Launder (1906–1997), English film director, producer and writer
- Simon Launder (born 1978), Welsh cricketer

== See also ==
- Launders (surname)
- Launder
