= Simon Launder =

Welsh cricketer

Simon Launder (born 2 December 1978) was a Welsh cricketer. He was a right-handed batsman and a right-arm medium-pace bowler who played for Oxfordshire. He was born in Swansea.

Launder, who made his Minor Counties Championship debut in 1999, made his List A debut in August 2002, against Lancashire CB, taking two wickets and scoring two runs.

His second and final List A appearance came almost exactly a year later, against Hertfordshire. Launder scored a golden duck from the tailend and took figures of 2-53.
