= Data laundering =

Data laundering is the conversion of stolen data so that it may be sold or used by ostensibly legitimate databases. ZDNET has described the process as "obscuring, removing, or fabricating the provenance of illegally obtained data such that it may be used for lawful purposes".

== Notable organizations ==
- ShinyHunters is a black-hat extortion organization believed to have formed in 2020 and was involved in several massive data breaches.

== Artificial intelligence ==
LAION, Stable Diffusion and other AI image generators have been accused of data laundering by the artists whose work has been used to train these programs. However, several court cases have ruled that the acquisition of these images for the purpose of training AI engines does not violate existing copyright law, so the term data laundering in these cases is inappropriate.
