= Launders (surname) =

Launders is a surname. Notable people with the surname include:

- Brian Launders (born 1976), Irish footballer
- Jimmy Launders (1919–1988), British Royal Navy officer

== See also ==
- Landers (surname)
- Launder (surname)
