= Fulling =

Pre-industrial process in making wool fabric

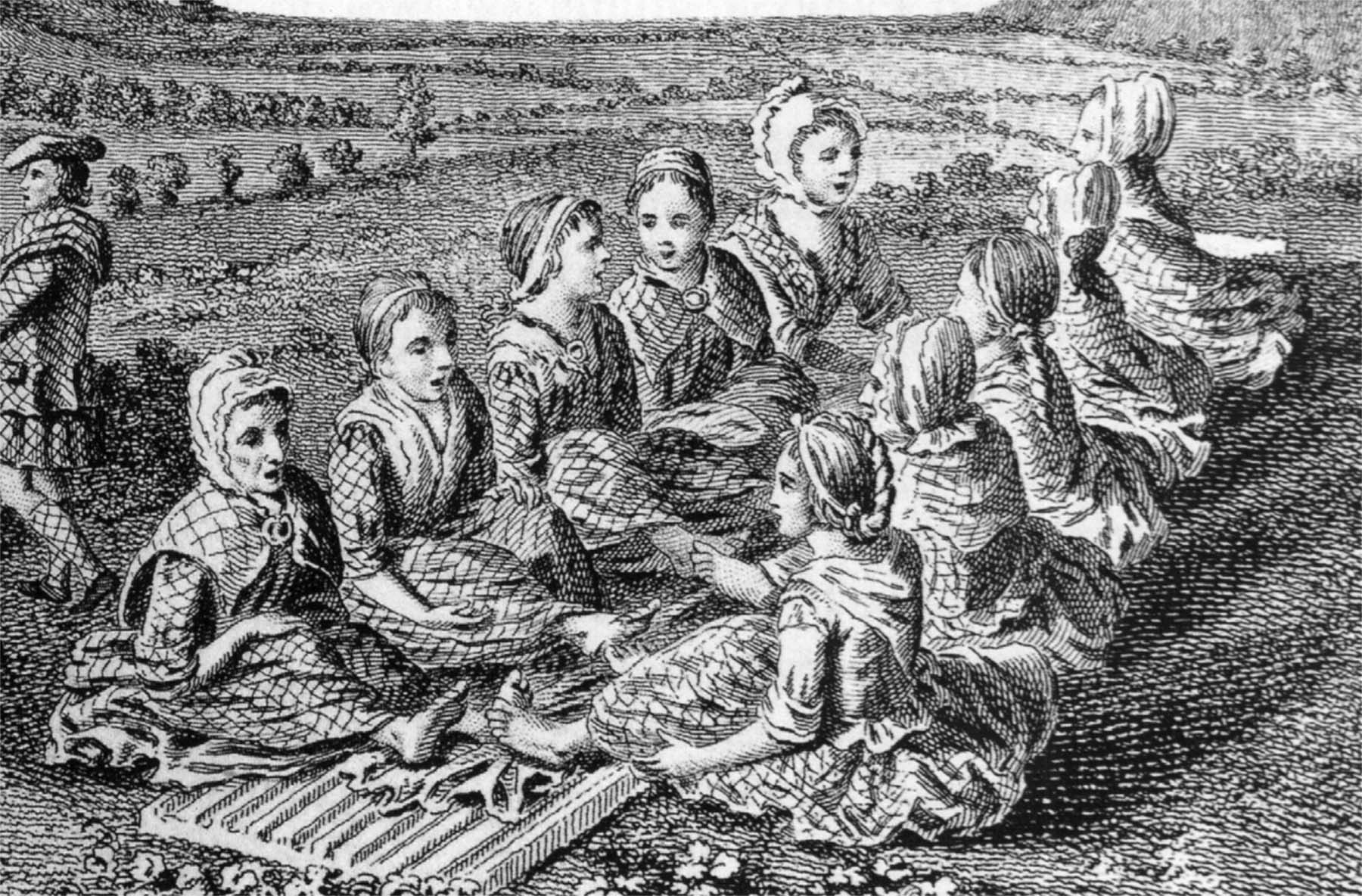
Scotswomen walking (fulling) woollen cloth, singing a waulking song, 1772 (engraving made by Thomas Pennant on one of his tours)

Fulling, also known as tucking or walking (Scots: waukin, hence often spelt waulking in Scottish English), is a step in woollen clothmaking which involves the cleansing of woven cloth (particularly wool) to eliminate (lanolin) oils, dirt, and other impurities, and to make it shrink by friction and pressure. The work delivers a smooth, tightly finished fabric that is insulating and water-repellent. Well-known examples are duffel cloth, first produced in Flanders in the 14th century, and loden, produced in Austria from the 16th century on.

Waulking could be done with the hands and feet. In medieval Europe, it was done in water-powered fulling mills. After the Industrial Revolution, coal and electric power were used.

Felting refers more generally to the interlocking of loose wool fibers; they need not be spun and woven first.

== Process ==
Fulling involves two processes: scouring (cleaning) and milling (thickening). Removing the oils encourages felting, and the cloth is pounded to clean it and to encourage the fibers to felt, so in practice the processes overlap.

=== Scouring ===
Urine was so important to the fulling business that it was taxed in Ancient Rome. Stale urine, known as wash or lant, was a source of ammonium salts and assisted in cleansing and whitening the cloth and having its fibers intertwined.

By the medieval period, fuller's earth had been introduced for use in the process. This is a soft clay-like material occurring naturally as an impure hydrous aluminium silicate. Worked through the cloth, it absorbs oils and dirt. It was used in conjunction with wash. More recently, soap has been used.

=== Milling ===
The second function of fulling was to thicken cloth by matting the fibres together to give it strength and increase waterproofing (felting). This was vital in the case of woollens, made from carded wool, but not for worsted materials made from combed wool. After this stage, water was used to rinse out the foul-smelling liquor used during cleansing. Felting of wool occurs upon hammering or other mechanical agitation because the microscopic scales on the surface of wool fibres hook together, somewhat like hook and loop fixings.

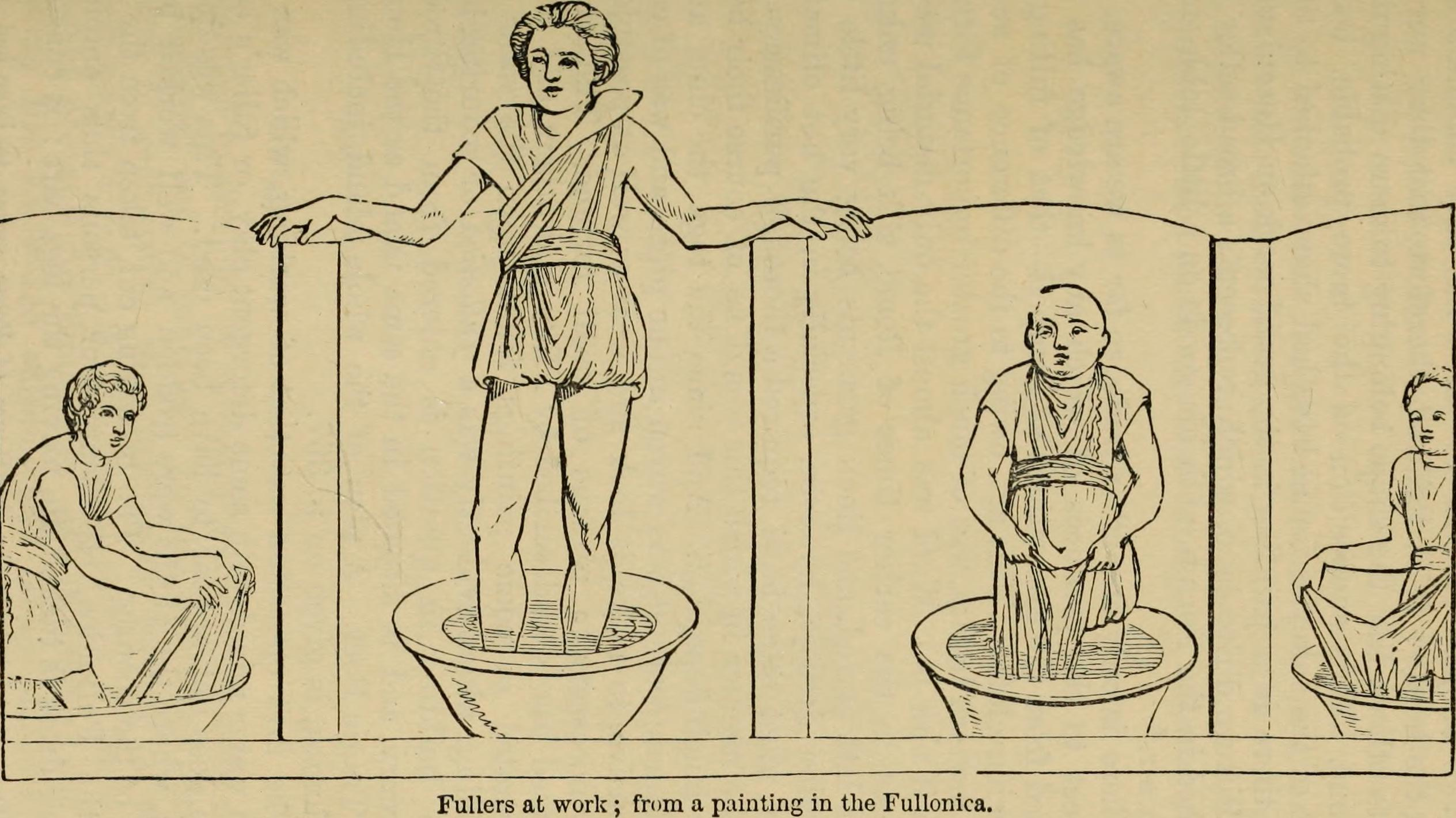
Manual trampling, drawing after an Ancient Roman fresco in the Fullonica of Stephanus, Pompeii. A fullonica is a fullery and laundry shop.

Originally, fulling was carried out by the pounding of the woollen cloth with a club, or the fuller's feet or hands. In Roman times, fulling was conducted by slaves working the cloth while ankle deep in tubs of human urine. Scotland, then a rather remote and un-industrialized region, retained manual methods into the 1700s. In Scottish Gaelic tradition, this process was accompanied by waulking songs, which women sang to set the pace.

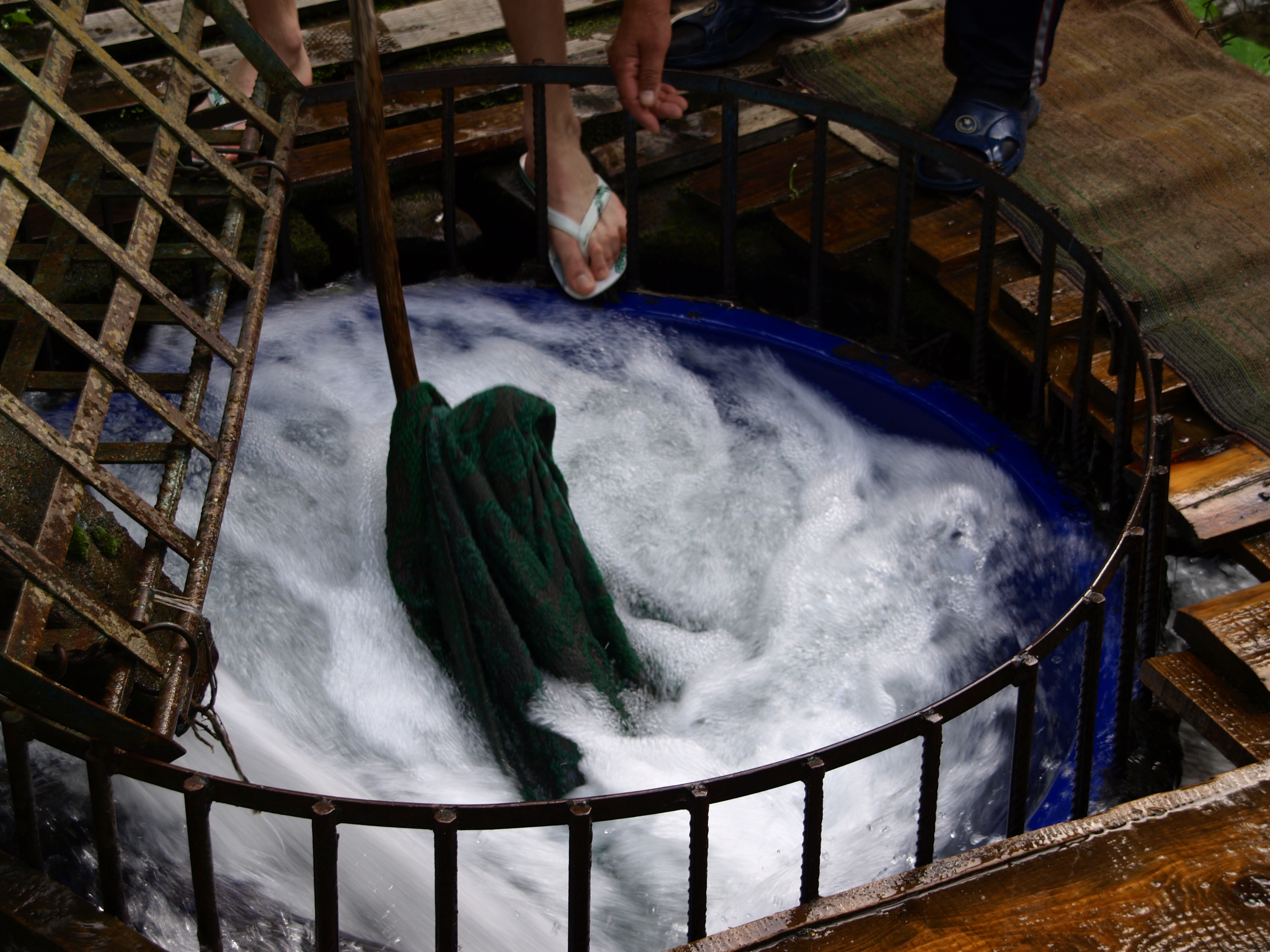
Fulling cloth by letting a waterfall agitate it

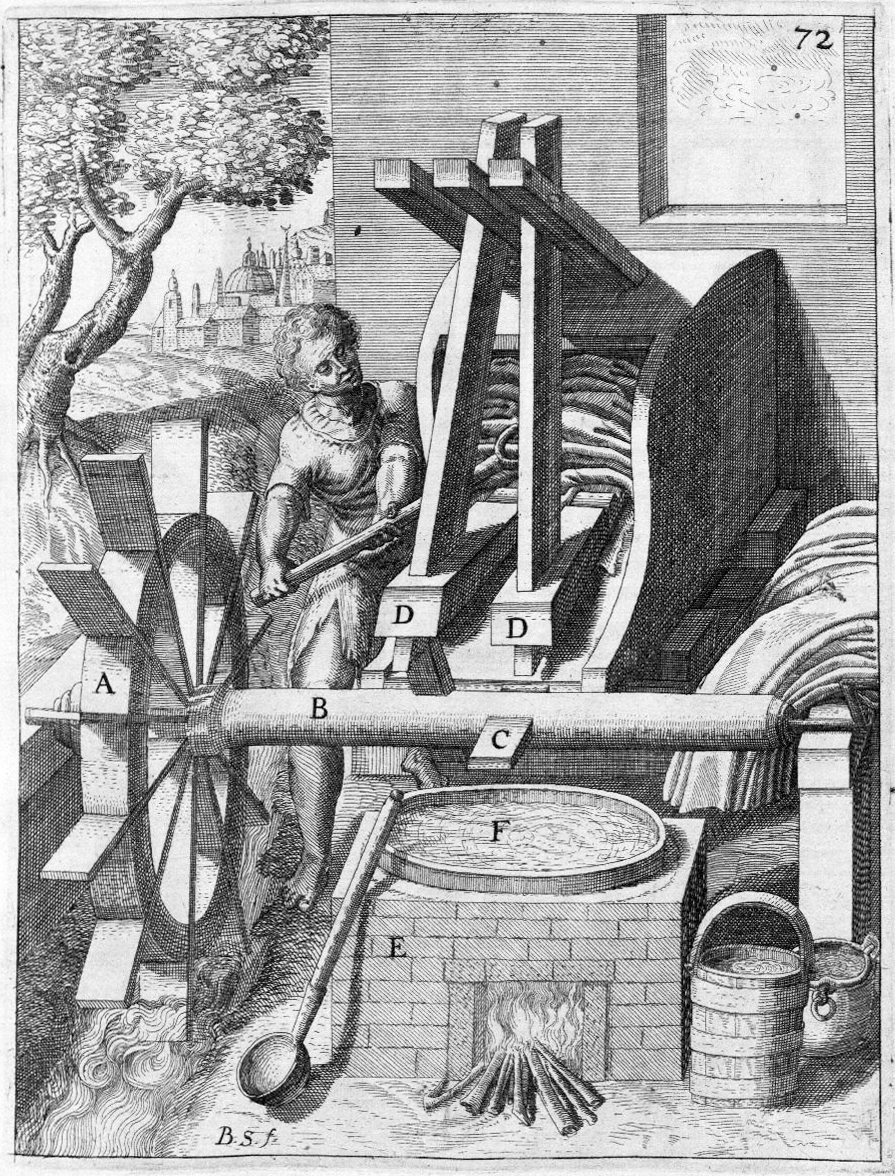
A driving-stock fulling mill from Georg Andreas Böckler's Theatrum Machinarum Novum, 1661

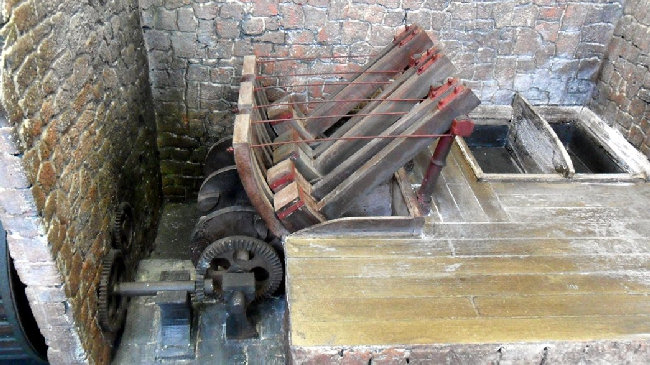
Model of a falling-stock machine, showing the set of hammers that drop in sequence to pound the cloth in the vats below

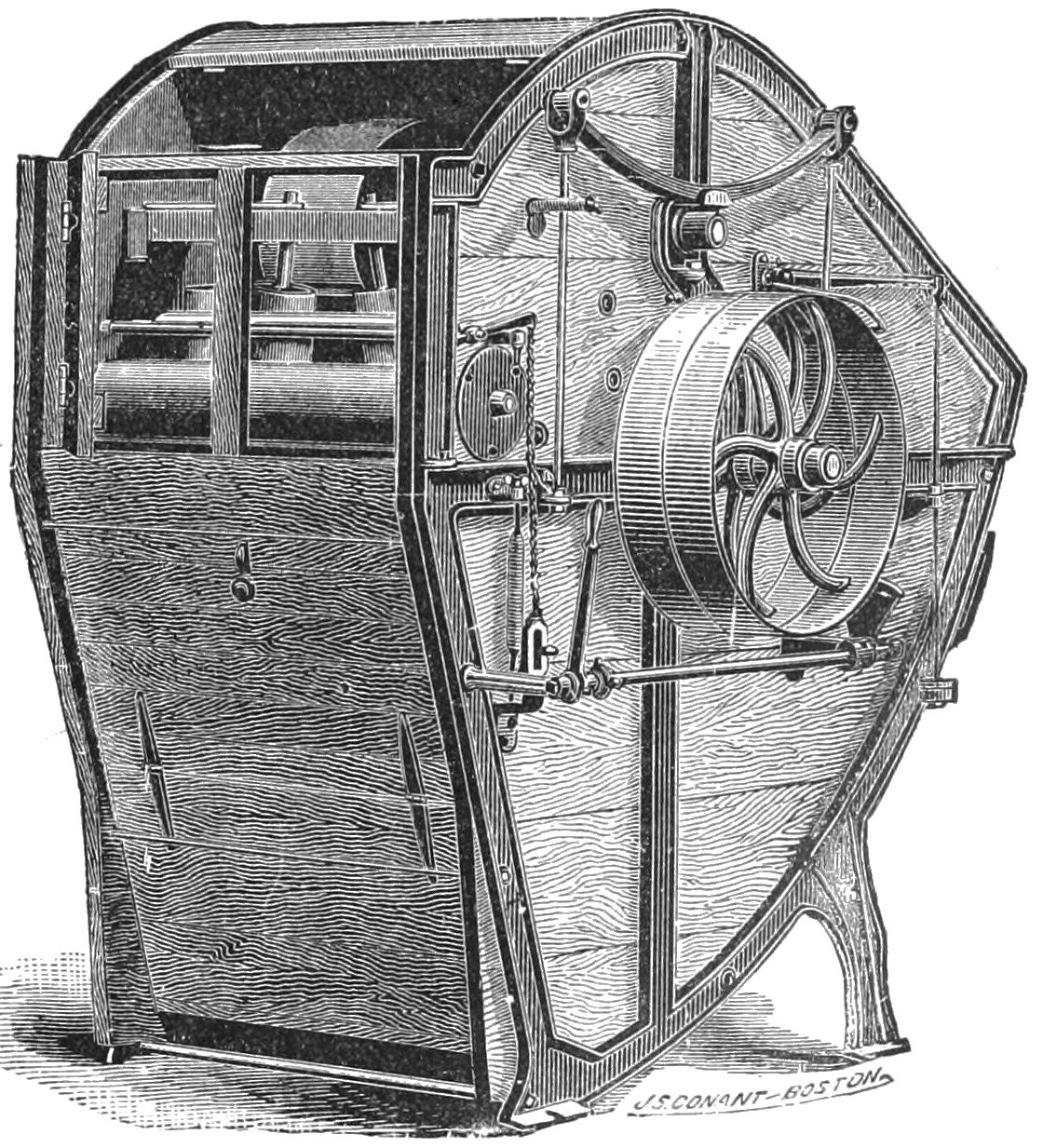
1891 illustration of a rotary fulling mill

From the medieval period, the fulling of cloth was often done in a water mill, known as a fulling mill, a walk mill, or a tuck mill, and in Wales, a pandy. They appear to have originated in the 9th or 10th century in Europe. The earliest known reference to a fulling mill in France, which dates from about 1086, was discovered in Normandy. There was a fulling mill established at Temple Guiting, Gloucestershire which was documented in the Domesday Book (also 1086). E. A. Lewis (possibly Welsh historian Edward Arthur Lewis) observed:

Fulling mills appear in Wales early in the reign of Edward II., just at the time when fulling mills were being introduced into Lancashire.

By the time of the Crusades in the late 11th century, fulling mills were active throughout the medieval world.

The mills beat the cloth with wooden hammers, known as fulling stocks or fulling hammers. Fulling stocks were of two kinds, falling stocks (operating vertically) that were used only for scouring, and driving or hanging stocks. In both cases the machinery was operated by cams on the shaft of a waterwheel or on a tappet wheel, which lifted the hammer.

Driving stocks were pivoted so that the foot (the head of the hammer) struck the cloth almost horizontally. The stock had a tub holding the liquor and cloth. This was somewhat rounded on the side away from the hammer, so that the cloth gradually turned, ensuring that all parts of it were milled evenly. However, the cloth was taken out about every two hours to undo plaits and wrinkles. The 'foot' was approximately triangular in shape, with notches to assist the turning of the cloth.

== Post-processing ==
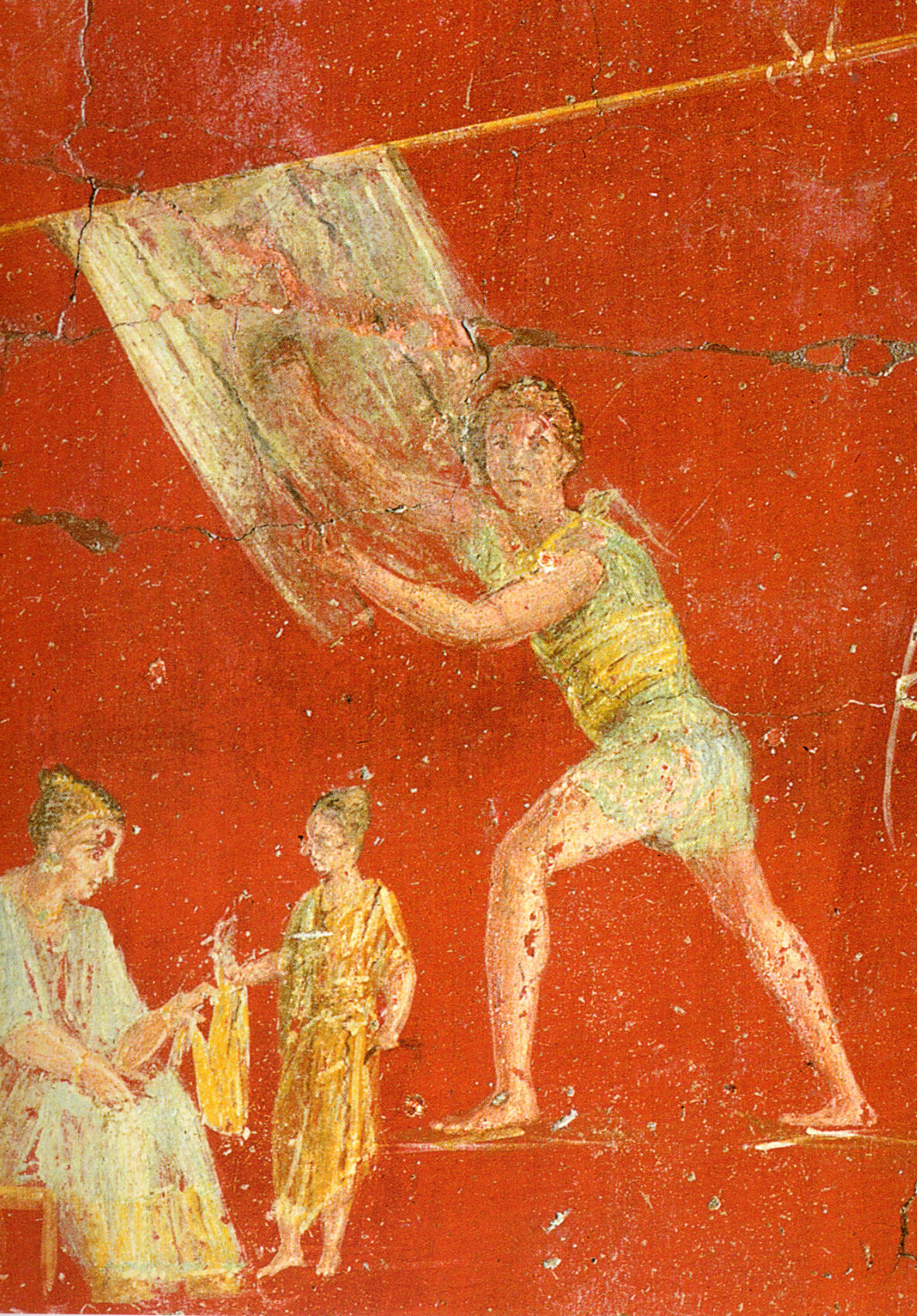
Raising the nap, Roman fresco

After fulling, cloth was stretched on great frames known as tenters, to which it is attached by tenterhooks (whence the phrase being on tenterhooks). The area where the tenters were erected was known as a tenterground.

Cloth would also have the nap raised by napping or gigging. The surface would then be sheared smooth. The process might be repeated for a smoother finish.

== Legacy ==
The names for workers who performed these tasks (fuller, tucker, and walker) have become common surnames.

The Welsh word for a fulling mill is pandy, which appears in many place-names, for example Tonypandy ('fulling mill lea').

== See also ==
- Beetling
- Bleachfield
- Dadeumi, a similar traditional practice in Korea
- List of laundry topics
- Posting (laundering process)

== Bibliography ==
- "full". Online Etymology Dictionary. Retrieved June 30, 2005.
- E. K. Scott, "Early Cloth Fulling and its Machinery", Trans. Newcomen Soc. 12 (1931), 30–52.
- E. M. Carus-Wilson, "An Industrial Revolution of the Thirteenth Century", Economic History Review, 11(1) (1941), 39–60.
- Reginald Lennard, "Early English Fulling Mills: additional examples", Economic History Review, 3(3) (1951), 342–343.
- R. A. Pelham, Fulling Mills (Society for the Protection of Ancient Buildings, (mills booklet 5), c. 1958)
- A. J. Parkinson, "Fulling mills in Merioneth", J. Merioneth Hist. & Rec. Soc. 9(4) (1984), 420–456.
- D. Druchunas Felting, Vogue Knitting, The Basics, Sixth & Spring Books, NY. (2005); p. 10.
