= Grape treading =

Traditional wine-making method

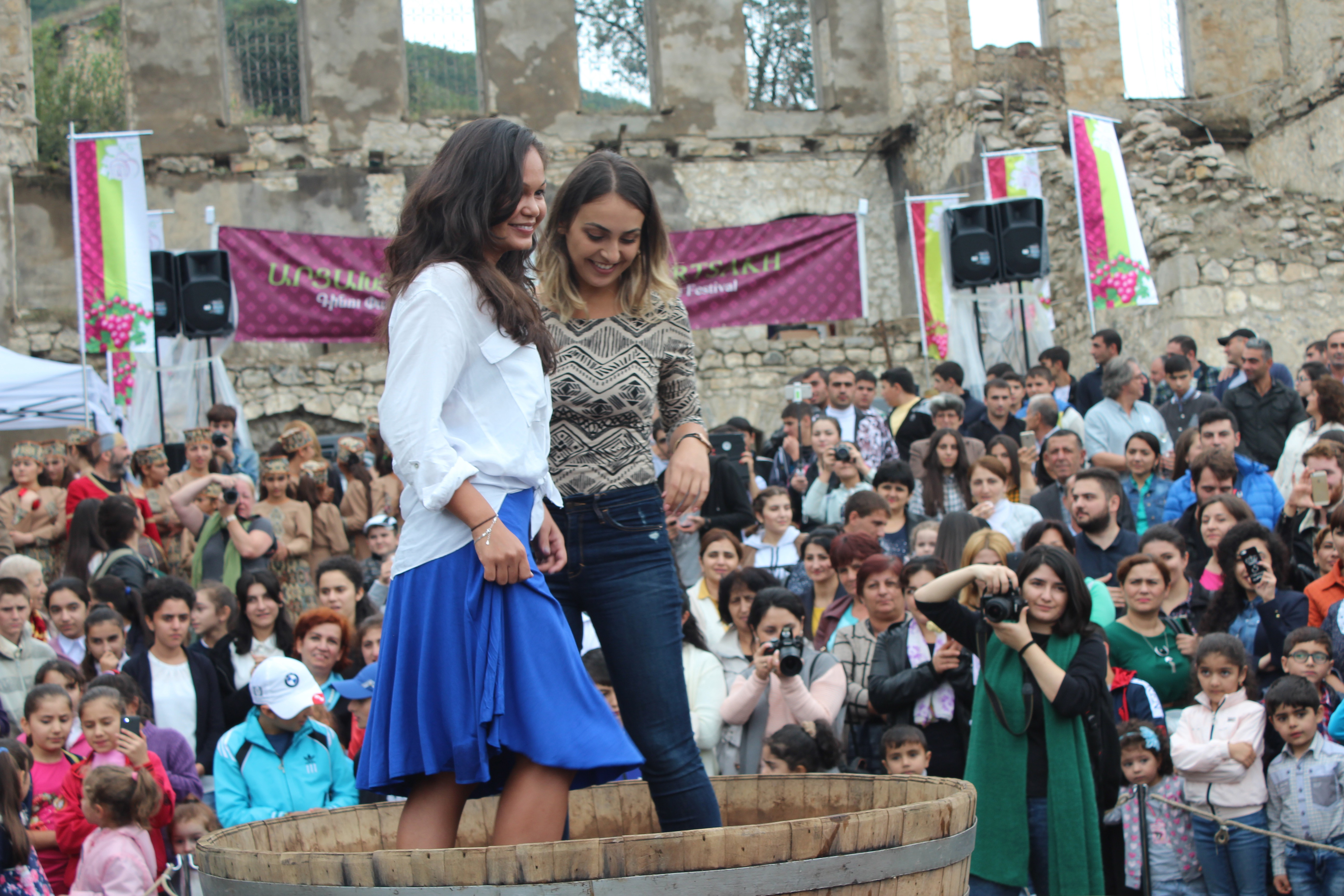
Arianne Caoili (left) performing grape stomping during the 3rd Annual Wine Festival in Artsakh

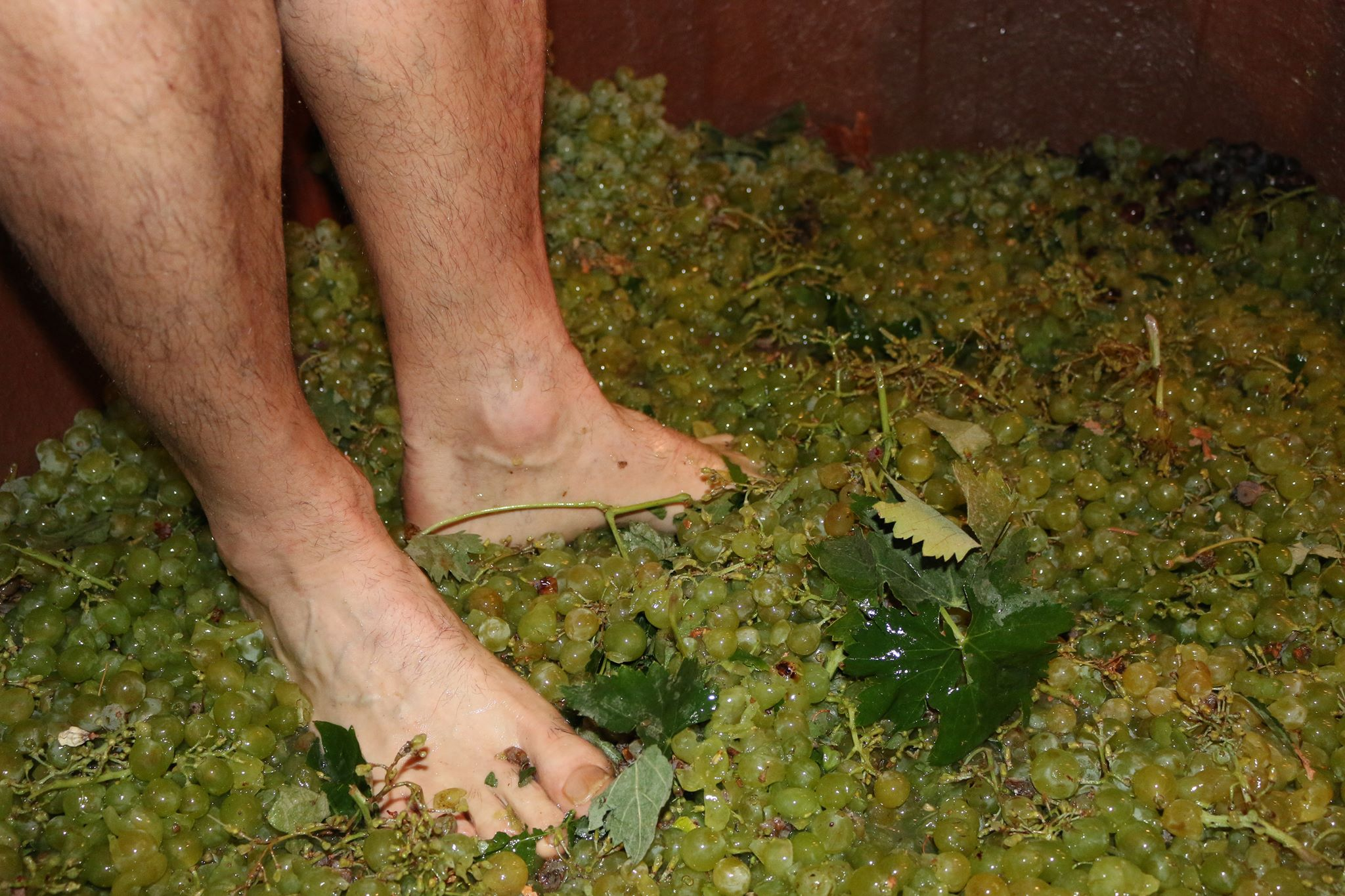
Grape stomping during the a traditional grape harvest festival in Spain.

Grape-treading or grape-stomping is part of the method of maceration used in traditional wine-making. Rather than being crushed in a wine press or by another mechanized method, grapes are repeatedly trampled in vats by barefoot participants to release their juices and begin fermentation. Grape-treading was widespread in the history of winemaking, but with the introduction of industrial methods, it now survives mostly as a recreational or competitive activity at cultural festivals.

== History ==
Grape stomping at the 2024 Historic Sonoma Valley Grape Stomp in Sonoma, California.

One of the earliest extant visual representations of the practice appears on a Roman Empire sarcophagus from the 3rd century AD, which depicts an idealized pastoral scene with a group of Erotes harvesting and stomping grapes at Vindemia, a rural festival.

Many contemporary wineries hold grape-stomping contests to attract visitors. The practice is also the subject of many depictions in contemporary media, including the 1974 Mel Tillis song "Stomp Them Grapes", the I Love Lucy episode "Lucy's Italian Movie", and The Littlest Grape Stomper, a children's book by Alan Madison.

The novel The Secret of Santa Vittoria and the film based on it, taking place in a wine-producing Italian town during WWII, include a grape treading scene which has a major role in the battle of wits between the townspeople and their German occupiers.

== Special experience ==
Harvest experience tours, also known as "harvest internships" or "crush camps," are tours or programs that allow visitors to experience the winemaking process firsthand by participating in the grape harvesting and crushing process. These tours are usually offered during the grape harvesting season, which varies depending on the region and the type of grapes being harvested. Harvest experience tours can be a fun and educational way to learn about the winemaking process and to see behind the scenes at a working winery.

== See also ==
- Posting (laundering process), a method of treading laundry with the feet
- Winepress
- History of the wine press
