= Posser =

Historical tool used for possing laundry

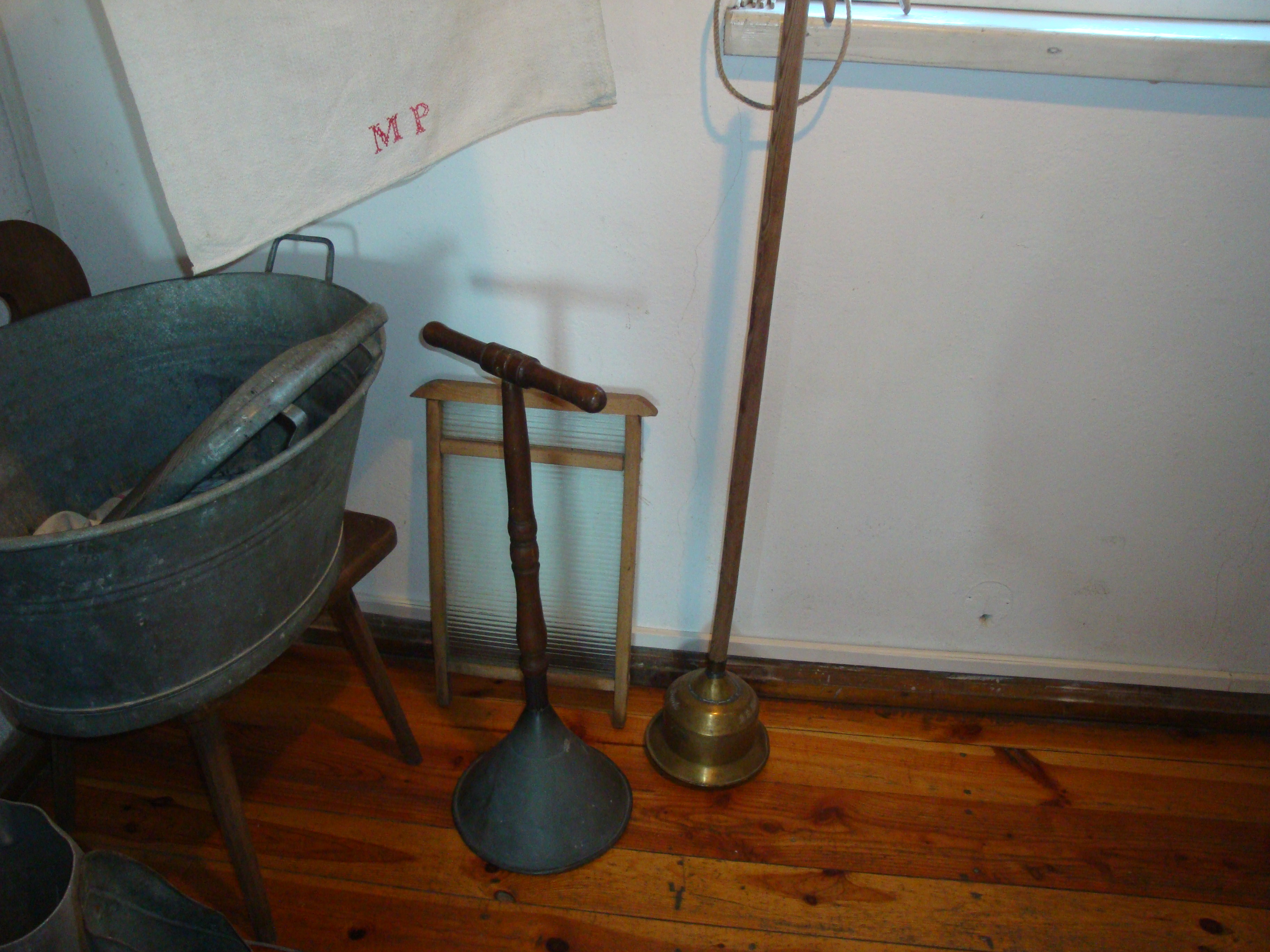
Two possers, a glass washboard and a dolly tub

A posser, ponch, washing dolly or a poss stick was historically a tool used for possing laundry by pumping the posser up and down on the laundry in the dolly tub or directly in the copper, or mixing laundry while hand washing it. Possers come in various forms; there is usually a vertical pole with a handle bar at the top but the base can be conical or domed. It has a double rim with a row of holes around the edge of the outer one. A similar tool with three (or more) legs was called a variety of names including posstick, peggy-legs, dolly-legs, and dolly-peg. Sometimes they took the form of a flat disk. The naming of each of these items was regionally specific and the specific meaning of word changed over time.

Clothes washing in the early nineteenth century rarely used soap, "bucking" with lye instead. It was a communal event, and infrequent. It involved clothes boards and bats. By the end of the nineteenth century, the tradition of a weekly washing day had been established. Soap was available in the forms of flakes and powder. The posser was not so much used to hammer the dirt out of the clothes, as to agitate the water which would be forced under pressure through the holes.

As hand washing has been replaced by electric and mechanical washing machines, words and implements used for hand washing have fallen out of common use.
