= Wet cleaning =

Method of professional laundry that avoids the use of organic solvents

Laundry symbol for professional wet cleaning

Wet cleaning refers to methods of professional cleaning that, in contrast to traditional dry cleaning, does not involve organic solvents such as tetrachloroethylene and hydrocarbons, but instead uses the inorganic solvent water with organic detergents.

Proponents of wet cleaning state that these methods can be used without shrinking or otherwise damaging garments that typically require dry cleaning.

== Usage ==
From American Dry Cleaner: "74.7% of dry cleaners use wet cleaning when cleaning casual clothing and sportswear; specialty items, like draperies and gowns (42.3%); “business casual” or softly tailored clothing (38%); restoration work (25.4%); and tailored workwear (16.9%).

== See also ==
- List of laundry topics
- Dry cleaning
- Self-service laundry
