= Laundry =

Washing of clothing and other textiles

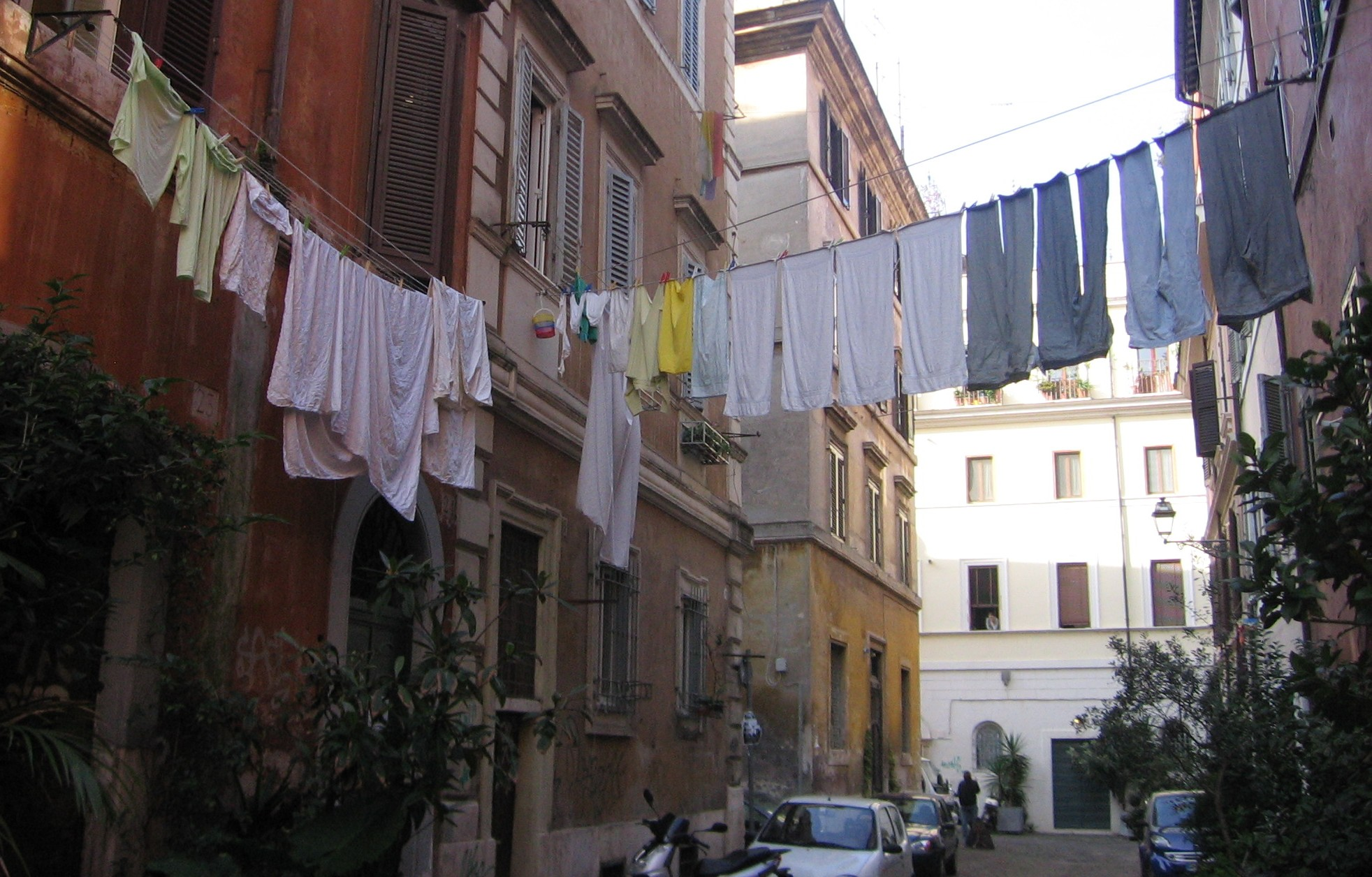
Laundry is hung to dry above an Italian street.

Laundry is the washing of clothing and other textiles, and, more broadly, their drying and ironing as well. Laundry has been part of history since humans began to wear clothes, so the methods by which different cultures have dealt with this universal human need are of interest to several branches of scholarship.

Laundry work has traditionally been highly gendered, with the responsibility in most cultures falling to women (formerly known as laundresses or washerwomen). The Industrial Revolution gradually led to mechanized solutions to laundry work, notably the washing machine and later the tumble dryer. Laundry, like cooking and child care, is still done both at home and by commercial establishments outside the home.

The word "laundry" may refer to the clothing itself, or to the place where the cleaning happens. An individual home may have a laundry room; a utility room includes, but is not restricted to, the function of washing clothes. An apartment building or student hall of residence may have a shared laundry facility. A stand-alone business is referred to as a self-service laundry (launderette in British English or laundromat in North American English).

== History ==
=== Watercourses ===
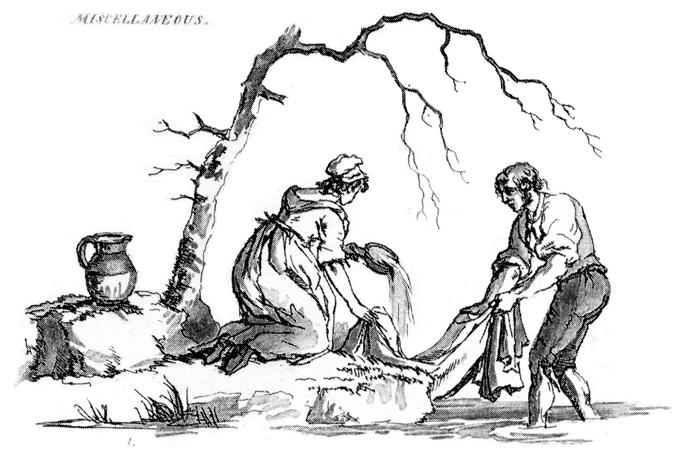
"Man and woman washing linen in a brook", from William Henry Pyne's Microcosm (1806). Unusually, this is depicted as a mixed-sex activity.

Laundry was first done in watercourses, letting the water carry away the materials which could cause stains and smells. Laundry is still done this way in the rural regions of poor countries.

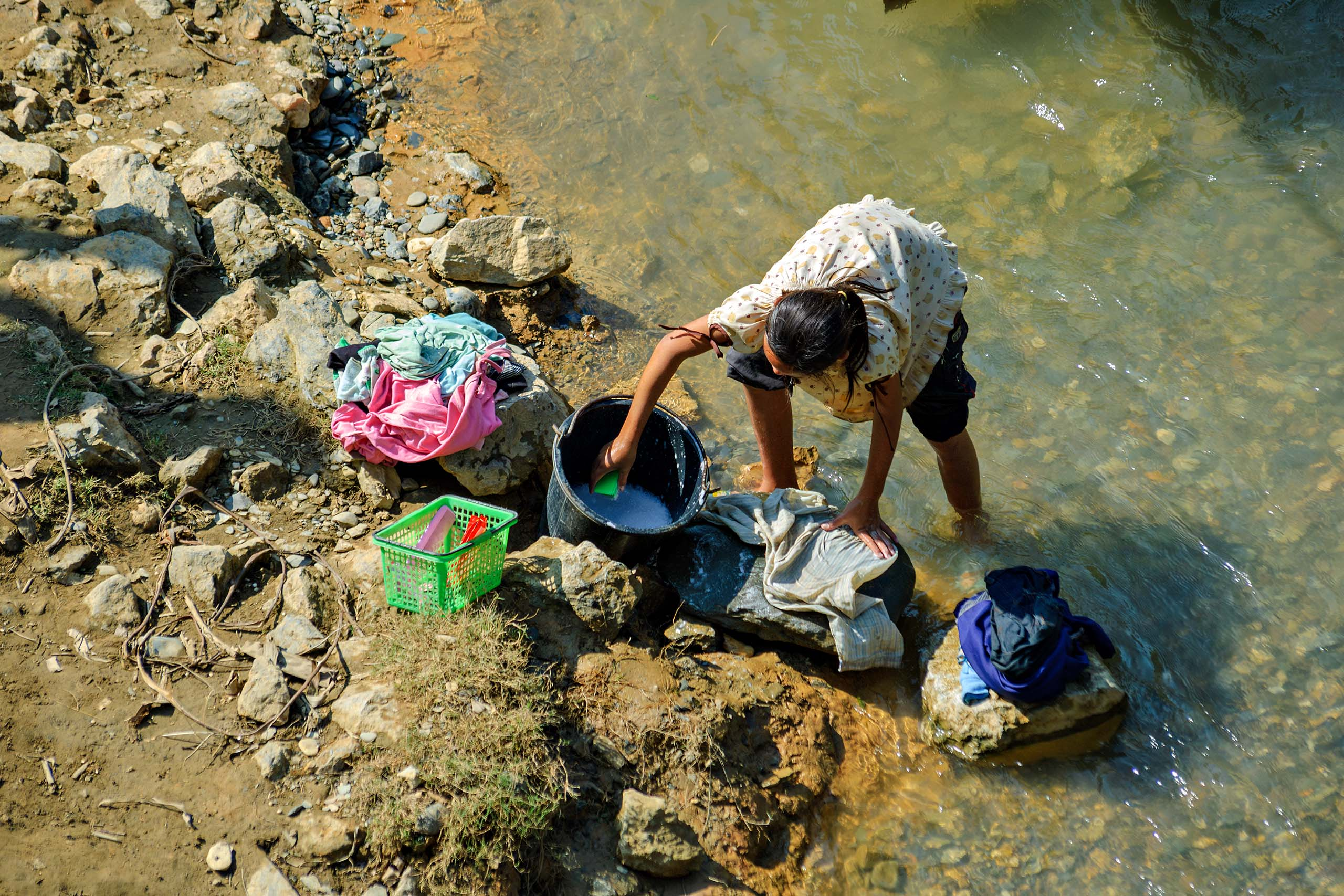
Laundry is being done by a woman in the river, near Kiou Ka Cham, Laos

Agitation helps remove the dirt, so the laundry was rubbed, twisted, or slapped against flat rocks. One name for this surface is a beetling-stone, related to beetling, a technique in the production of linen; one name for a wooden substitute is a battling-block. The dirt was beaten out with a wooden implement known as a washing paddle, battling stick, bat, beetle or club. Wooden or stone scrubbing surfaces set up near a water supply were gradually replaced by portable rub boards, eventually factory-made corrugated glass or metal washboards.

Once clean, the clothes were wrung out — twisted to remove most of the water. Then they were hung up on poles or clothes lines to air dry, or sometimes just spread out on clean grass, bushes, or trees.

=== Washhouses ===
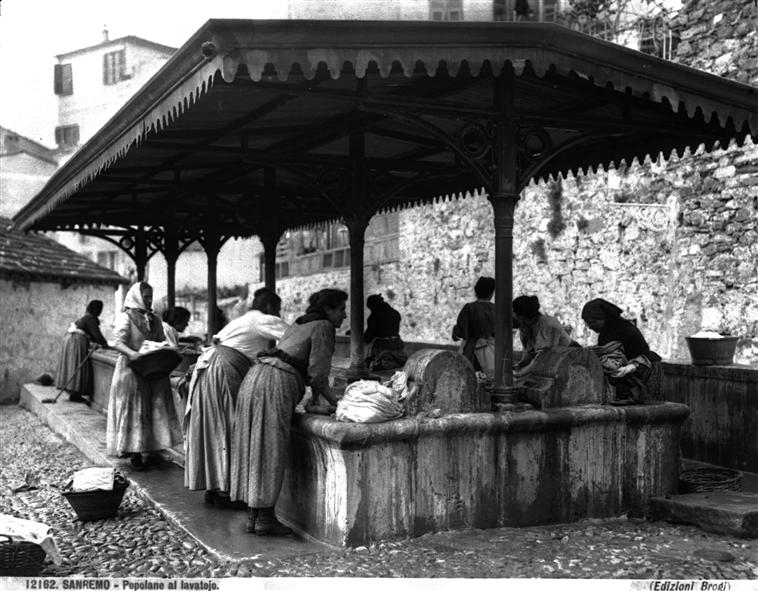
Washhouse in Sanremo, Italy, at about the turn of the 20th century

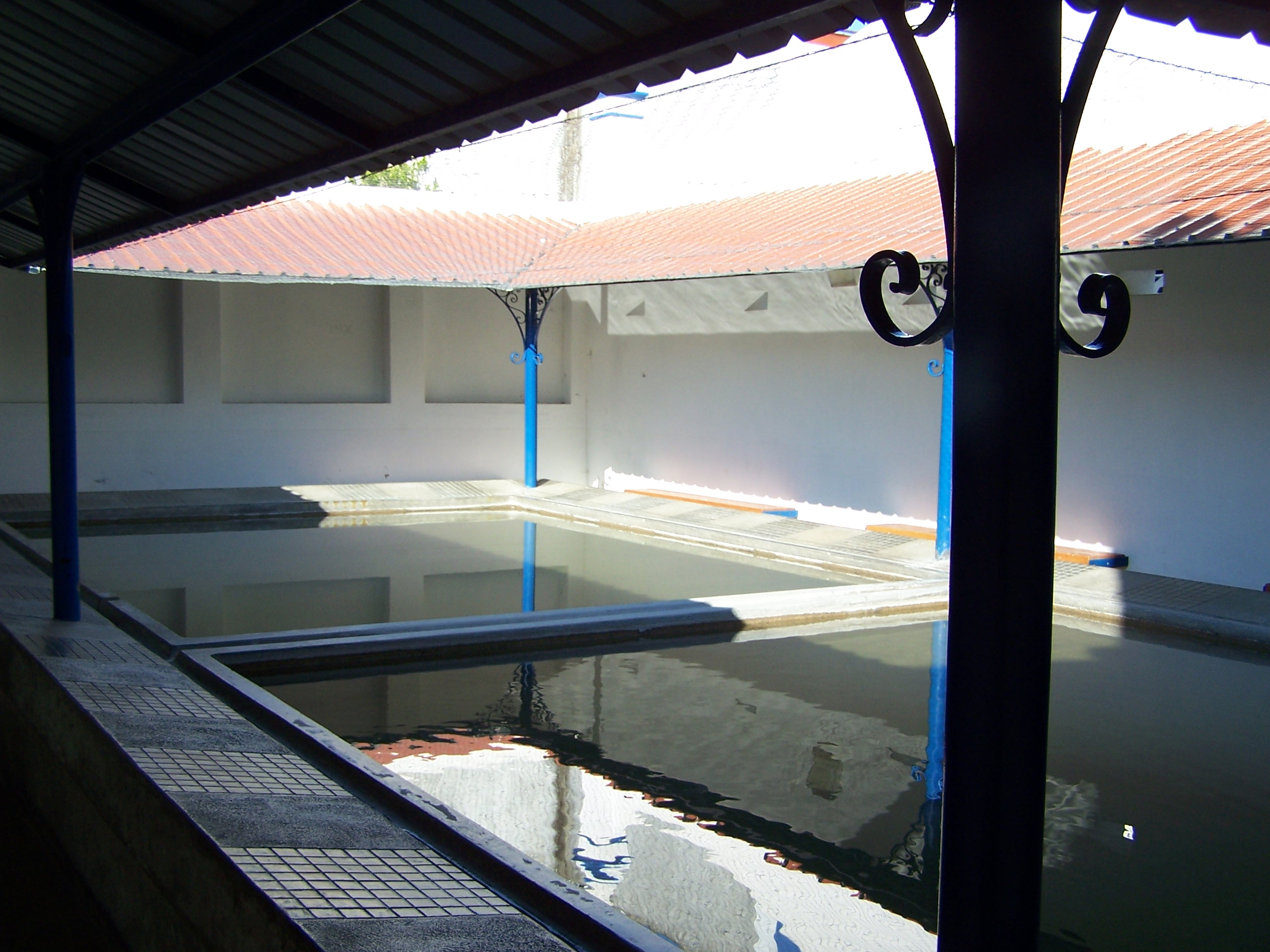
Washhouse in Cabeção, Portugal, today. Note the two basins and inclined stone lip.

Before the advent of the washing machine, laundry was often done in a communal setting.

Villages across Europe that could afford it built a wash-house, sometimes known by the French name of lavoir. Water was channelled from a stream or spring and fed into a building, possibly just a roof with no walls. This wash-house usually contained two basins – one for washing and the other for rinsing – through which the water was constantly flowing, as well as a stone lip inclined towards the water against which the wet laundry could be beaten. Such facilities were more comfortable and convenient than washing in a watercourse. Some lavoirs had the wash-basins at waist height, although others remained on the ground. The launderers were protected to some extent from rain, and their travel was reduced, as the facilities were usually at hand in the village or at the edge of a town. These facilities were public and available to all families, and usually used by the entire village. Many of these village wash-houses are still standing, historic structures with no obvious modern purpose.

The job of doing the laundry was reserved for women, who washed all their family's laundry. Washerwomen (laundresses) took in the laundry of others, charging by the piece. As such, wash-houses were an obligatory stop in many women's weekly lives and became a sort of institution or meeting place. It was a women-only space where they could discuss issues or simply chat (see the concept of the village pump). Indeed, this tradition is reflected in the Catalan idiom "fer safareig" (literally, "to do the laundry"), which means to gossip.

European cities also had public wash-houses. The city authorities wanted to give the poorer population, who would otherwise not have access to laundry facilities, the opportunity to wash their clothes. Sometimes these facilities were combined with public baths, see for example Baths and wash houses in Britain. The aim was to foster hygiene and thus reduce outbreaks of epidemics.

Sometimes large metal cauldrons (a "wash copper", even when not made of that metal), were filled with fresh water and heated over a fire, as hot or boiling water is more effective than cold in removing dirt. A posser could be used to agitate clothes in a tub. A related implement called a washing dolly is "a wooden stick or mallet with an attached cluster of legs or pegs" that moves the cloth through the water.

=== Washing machines and other devices ===
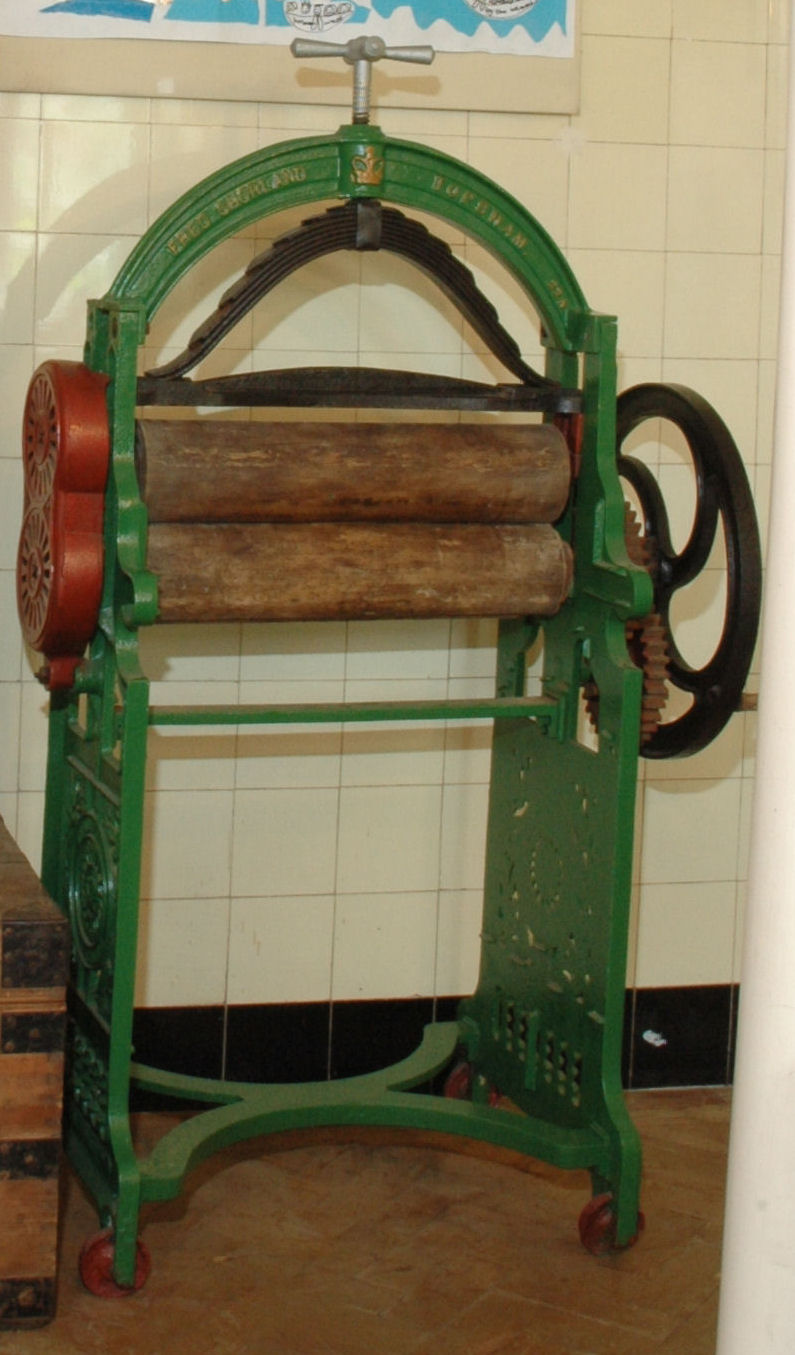
A typical mangle of the early 20th Century

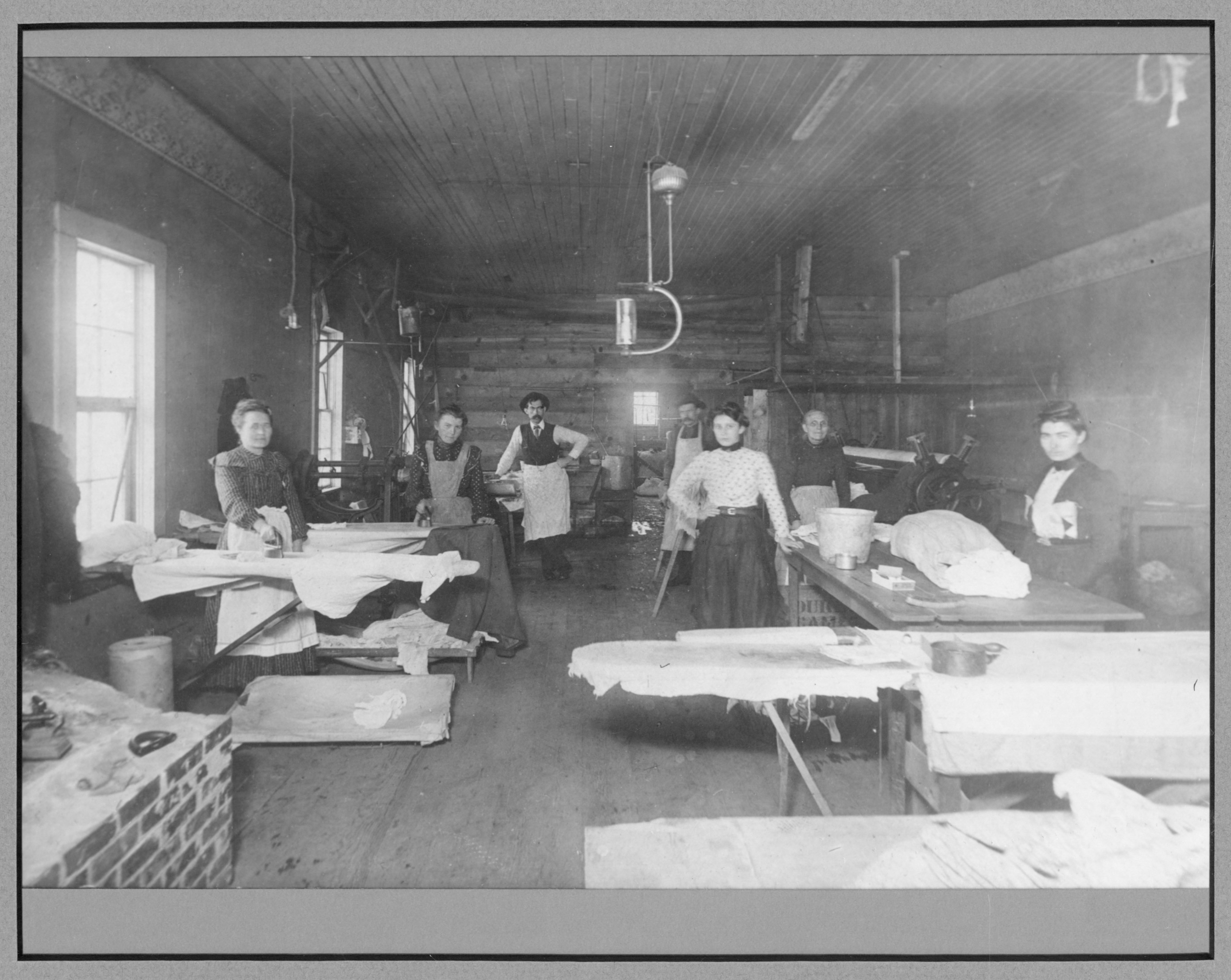
Model Steam Laundry, Colfax, Washington, c. 1900

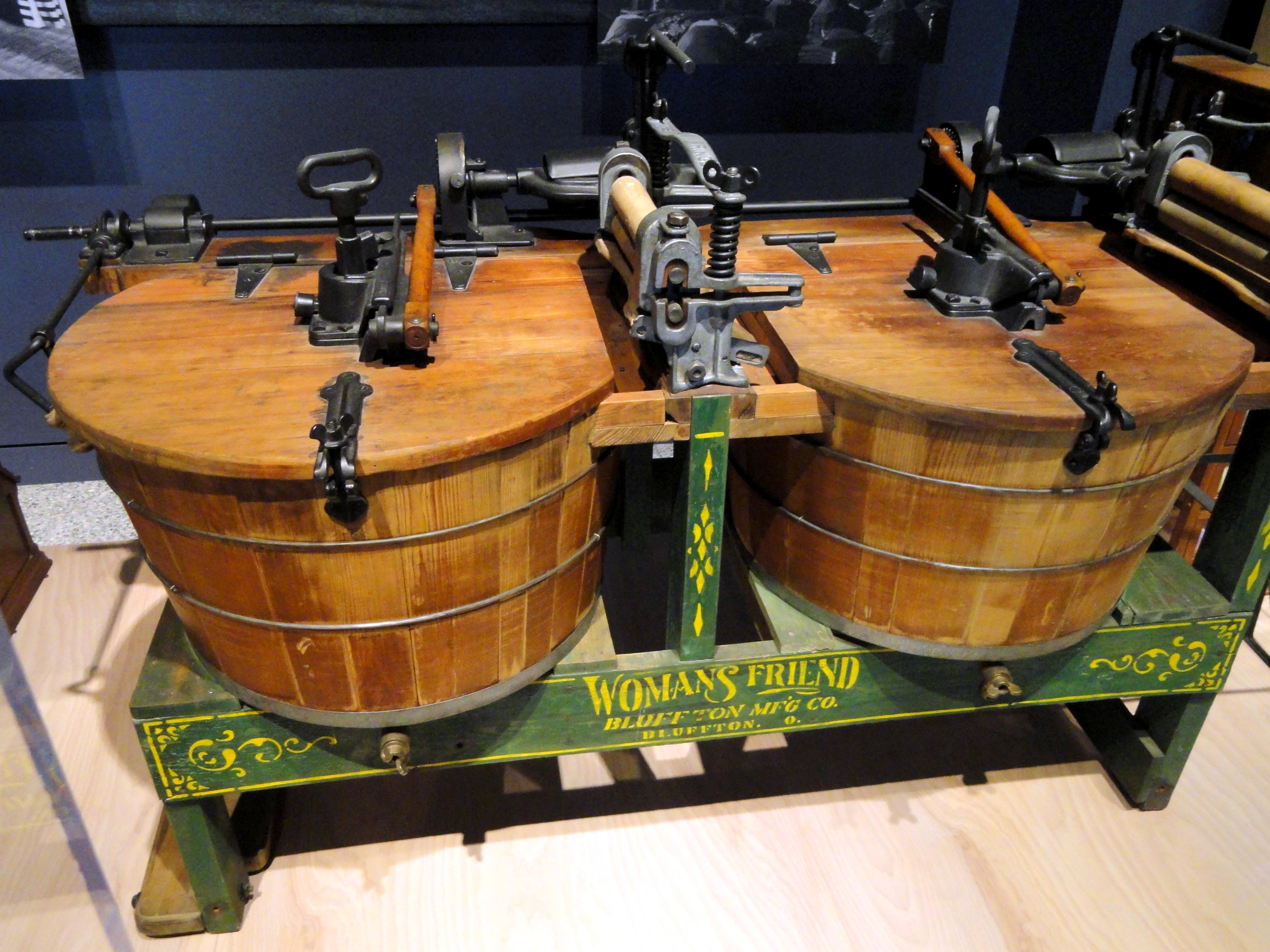
The "Woman's Friend" washing machine, c. 1890 U.S.

The Industrial Revolution completely transformed laundry technology. Christina Hardyment, in her history from the Great Exhibition of 1851, argues that it was the development of domestic machinery that led to women's liberation.

The mangle (or "wringer" in American English) was developed in the 19th century — two long rollers in a frame and a crank to revolve them. A laundry-worker took sopping wet clothing and cranked it through the mangle, compressing the cloth and expelling the excess water. The mangle was much quicker than hand twisting. It was a variation on the box mangle used primarily for pressing and smoothing cloth.

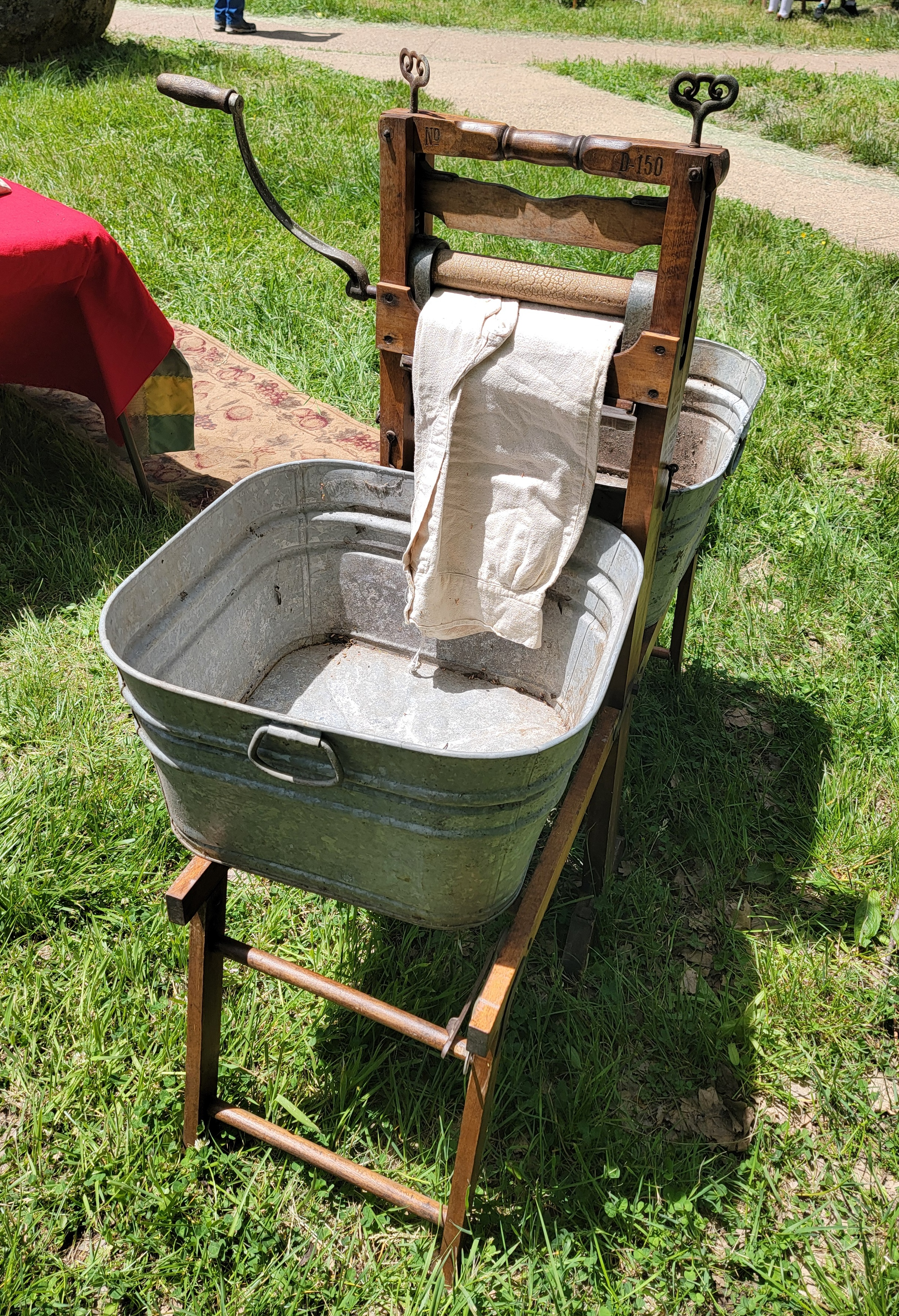
A clothes wringer and hand washing tubs

Meanwhile, 19th-century inventors further mechanized the laundry process with various hand-operated washing machines to replace tedious hand rubbing against a washboard. Most involved turning a handle to move paddles inside a tub. Then some early-20th-century machines used an electrically powered agitator. Many of these washing machines were simply a tub on legs, with a hand-operated mangle on top. Later the mangle too was electrically powered, then replaced by a perforated double tub, which spun out the excess water in a spin cycle.

Laundry drying was also mechanized, with clothes dryers. Dryers were also spinning perforated tubs, but they blew heated air rather than water.

=== Chinese laundries in North America ===
In the late 19th and early 20th century, Chinese immigrants to the United States and to Canada were well represented as laundry workers. Discrimination, lack of English-language skills, and lack of capital kept Chinese immigrants out of most desirable careers. Around 1900, one in four ethnic Chinese men in the U.S. worked in a laundry, typically working 10 to 16 hours a day.

Chinese people in New York City were running an estimated 3,550 laundries at the beginning of the Great Depression. In 1933, the city's Board of Aldermen passed a law clearly intended to drive the Chinese out of the business. Among other things, it limited ownership of laundries to U.S. citizens. The Chinese Consolidated Benevolent Association tried fruitlessly to fend this off, resulting in the formation of the openly leftist Chinese Hand Laundry Alliance (CHLA), which successfully challenged this provision of the law, allowing Chinese laundry workers to preserve their livelihoods. The CHLA went on to function as a more general civil rights group; its numbers declined strongly after it was targeted by the FBI during the Second Red Scare (1947–1957).

=== South Africa ===
From 1850 to 1910, Zulu men took on the task of laundering the clothes of Europeans, both Boers and British. "Laundering recalled the specialist craft of hide-dressing in which Zulu males engaged as izinyanga, a prestige occupation that paid handsomely." They created a guild structure, similar to a union, to guard their conditions and wages, evolving into "one, if not indeed the most, powerful group of African work-men in nineteenth-century Natal".

=== India ===
In India, laundry was traditionally done by men. A washerman was called a dhobiwallah, and dhobi became the name of their caste group.

A laundry-place is generally called a dhobi ghat; this has given rise to place names where they work or worked, including Mahalaxmi Dhobi Ghat in Mumbai, Dhoby Ghaut in Singapore and Dhobi Ghaut in Penang, Malaysia.

=== Philippines ===
Until the early 1980s, when washing machines became more affordable in the country, much of the laundry work in the Philippines was done manually, and this role was generally assigned to women. A professional laundrywoman was called a labandera.

=== Ancient Rome ===
The workers in ancient Rome who cleaned the cloth were called fullones, singular fullo (cf fulling, a process in wool-making, and Fuller's earth, used to clean). Clothes were treated in small tubs standing in niches surrounded by low walls, known as treading or fulling stalls. The tub was filled with water and a mixture of alkaline chemicals (sometimes including urine). The fuller stood in the tub and trampled the cloth, a technique known elsewhere as posting. The aim of this treatment was to apply the chemical agents to the cloth so that they could do their work, the resolving of greases and fats. These stalls are so typical of these workshops that they are used to identify fullonicae in the archaeological remains.

== Laundry processes ==
Laundry processes include washing (usually with water containing detergents or other chemicals), agitation, rinsing, drying, pressing (ironing), and folding. The washing will sometimes be done at a temperature above room temperature to increase the activities of any chemicals used and the solubility of stains, and high temperatures kill micro-organisms that may be present on the fabric. However, it is advised that cotton be washed at a cooler temperature to prevent shrinking. Many professional laundry services are present in the market which offers at different price range.

Agitation helps remove dirt which is usually mobilised by surfactants from between fibres, however, due to the small size of the pores in fibres, the 'stagnant core' of the fibres themselves see virtually no flow. The fibres are nevertheless rapidly cleaned by diffusiophoresis carrying dirt out into the clean water during the rinsing process.

=== Chemicals ===
Various chemicals may be used to increase the solvent power of water, such as the compounds in soaproot or yucca-root used by Native American tribes, or the ash lye (usually sodium hydroxide or potassium hydroxide) once widely used for soaking laundry in Europe. Soap, a compound made from lye and fat, is an ancient and common laundry aid. Modern washing machines typically use synthetic powdered or liquid laundry detergent in place of more traditional soap.

=== Cleaning or dry cleaning ===
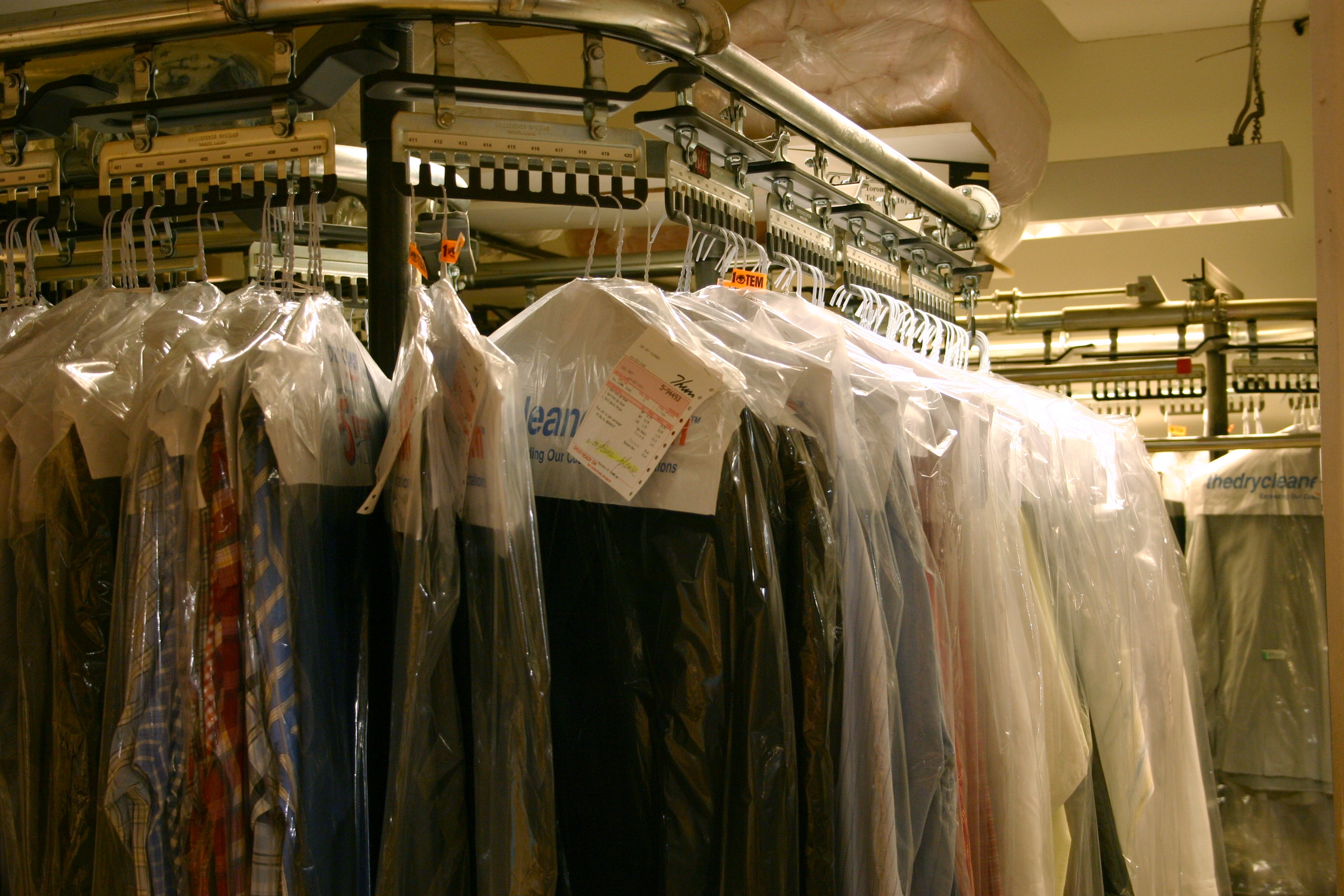
Many dry cleaners place cleaned clothes inside thin clear plastic garment bags.

Dry cleaning refers to any process which uses a chemical solvent other than water. The solvent used is typically tetrachloroethylene (perchloroethylene), which the industry calls "perc". It is used to clean delicate fabrics that cannot withstand the rough and tumble of a washing machine and clothes dryer; it can also obviate labor-intensive hand washing.

== Shared laundry rooms ==
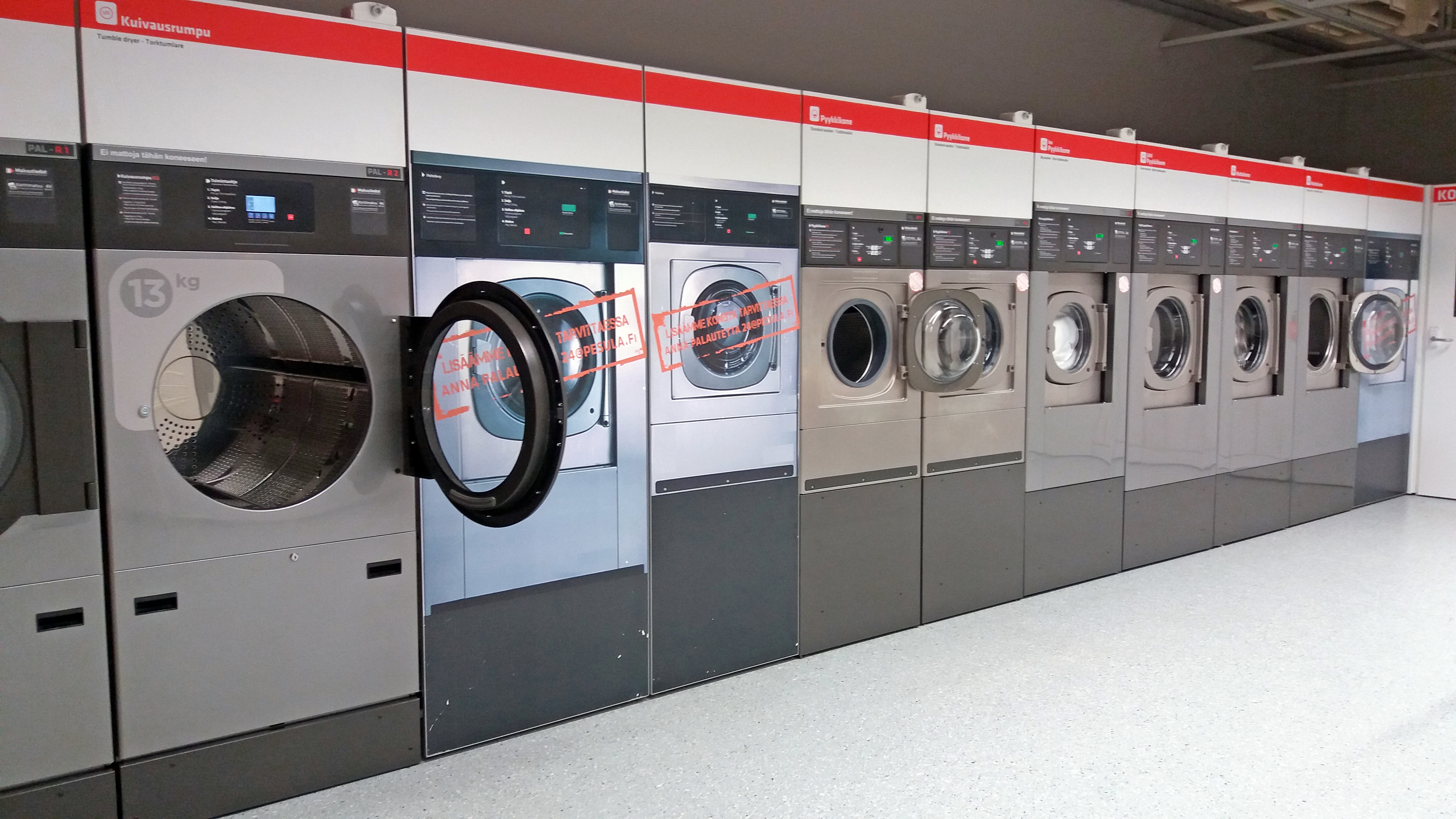
24 Pesula laundry in Jyväskylä, Finland

In some parts of the world, including North America, apartment buildings and dormitories often have laundry rooms, where residents share washing machines and dryers. Usually the machines are set to run only when money is put in a coin slot.

In other parts of the world, including Europe, apartment buildings with laundry rooms are uncommon, and each apartment may have its own washing machine. Those without a machine at home or the use of a laundry room must either wash their clothes by hand or visit a commercial self-service laundry (laundromat, laundrette) or a laundry shop.

== Laundry drying ==
A clothes dryer (tumble dryer, drying machine or simply dryer) is an electric household appliance used to remove moisture from loaded clothes, linens and other textiles, usually after washing them in a washing machine. In the United States and Canada, more than 80% of all homes have clothes dryers.

The manual clothes dryer was created in 1800 by M. Pochon from France. Henry W. Altorfer invented and patented the electric clothes dryer in 1937. J. Ross Moore, a North Dakota inventor, designed automatic clothes dryers and published his electric dryer design in 1938. Industrial designer Brooks Stevens designed an electric dryer with a glass window in the early 1940s.

Sometimes dryers are integrated with the washing machine in the form of washer-dryer combos, which are essentially a front-loading washing machine with a built-in dryer or (in the U.S.) a laundry center, which mounts a dryer on top of the washing machine and combines the controls for both machines into one control panel. Often the washer and dryer functions have different capacities, with the dryer usually having a lower capacity than the washer. Laundry dryers can also be top-loading, in which the drum is loaded from the top of the machine and the drum end supports are on the left and right sides, rather than the more traditional front and back sides of the machine. They can be up to 40 centimeters (16 inches) wide and can include removable stationary shelves for drying things like stuffed toys and shoes.

Drying at a temperature of at least 60 °C (140 °F) for thirty minutes kills many parasites, including house dust mites, bed bugs, and scabies mites and their eggs; just over ten minutes kills mites. Simple washing kills dust mites, and exposure to direct sunlight for three hours kills their eggs.

== Right to dry movement ==
Some American communities forbid their residents from drying clothes outside, and citizens protesting this have created a "right to dry" movement. Many homeowners' associations and other communities in the United States prohibit residents from using a clothesline outdoors, or limit such use to locations that are not visible from the street or to certain times of day. Other communities, however, expressly prohibit rules that prevent the use of clotheslines. Some organizations have been campaigning against legislation which has outlawed line-drying of clothing in public places, especially given the increased greenhouse gas emissions produced by some types of electrical power generation needed to power electric clothes dryers, since driers can constitute a considerable fraction of a home's total energy usage.

Florida ("the Sunshine State") is the only state to expressly guarantee a right to dry, although Utah and Hawaii have passed solar rights legislation. A Florida law explicitly states: "No deed restrictions, covenants, or similar binding agreements running with the land shall prohibit or have the effect of prohibiting solar collectors, clotheslines, or other energy devices based on renewable resources from being installed on buildings erected on the lots or parcels covered by the deed restrictions, covenants, or binding agreements." No other state has such clearcut legislation. Vermont considered a "Right to Dry" bill in 1999, but it was defeated in the Senate Natural Resources & Energy Committee. The language has been included in a 2007 voluntary energy conservation bill, introduced by Senator Dick McCormack. Legislation making it possible for thousands of American families to start using clotheslines in communities where they were formerly banned was passed in Colorado in 2008. In 2009, clothesline legislation was debated in the states of Connecticut, Hawaii, Maryland, Maine, New Hampshire, Nebraska, Oregon, Virginia, and Vermont.

Similar measures have been introduced in Canada - in particular, the province of Ontario.

== Common problems ==
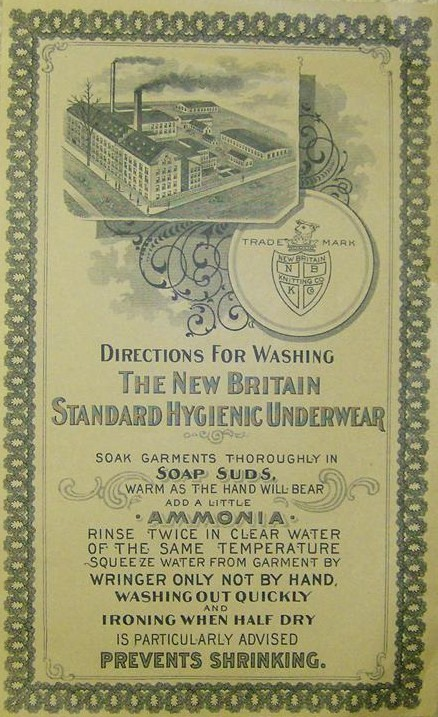
Directions for hand-washing New Britain Standard Hygienic Underwear, circa 1915

Novice users of modern laundry machines sometimes experience accidental shrinkage of garments, especially when applying heat. For wool garments, this is due to scales on the fibers, which heat and agitation cause to stick together. Other fabrics (like cotton) have their fibers stretched by mechanical force during production, and can shrink slightly when heated (though to a lesser degree than wool). Some clothes are "pre-shrunk" to avoid this problem.

Another common problem is color bleeding from dyed articles to white or pale-colored ones. Many laundry guides suggest washing whites separately from colored items. Sometimes only similar colors are washed together to avoid this problem, which is lessened by cold water and repeated washings. Sometimes this blending of colors is seen as a selling point, as with madras cloth.

Laundry symbols are included on many clothes to help consumers avoid these problems.

Synthetic fibers in laundry can also contribute to microplastic pollution.

== Etymology ==
The word laundry comes from Middle English lavendrye, laundry, from Old French lavanderie, from lavandier.

== In culture ==
- In Homer's Odyssey, Princess Nausicaa and her handmaidens are washing laundry by the shore when they see and rescue the ship-wrecked Ulysses.
- A 1972 short story "The Mangler" by Stephen King and its 1995 film adaptation directed by Tobe Hooper take place at the Blue Ribbon Laundry, where a demon-possessed mangler spreads terror.

== See also ==
- List of laundry topics
- Laundry hygiene
