= Major appliance =

Large machine which accomplishes routine housekeeping

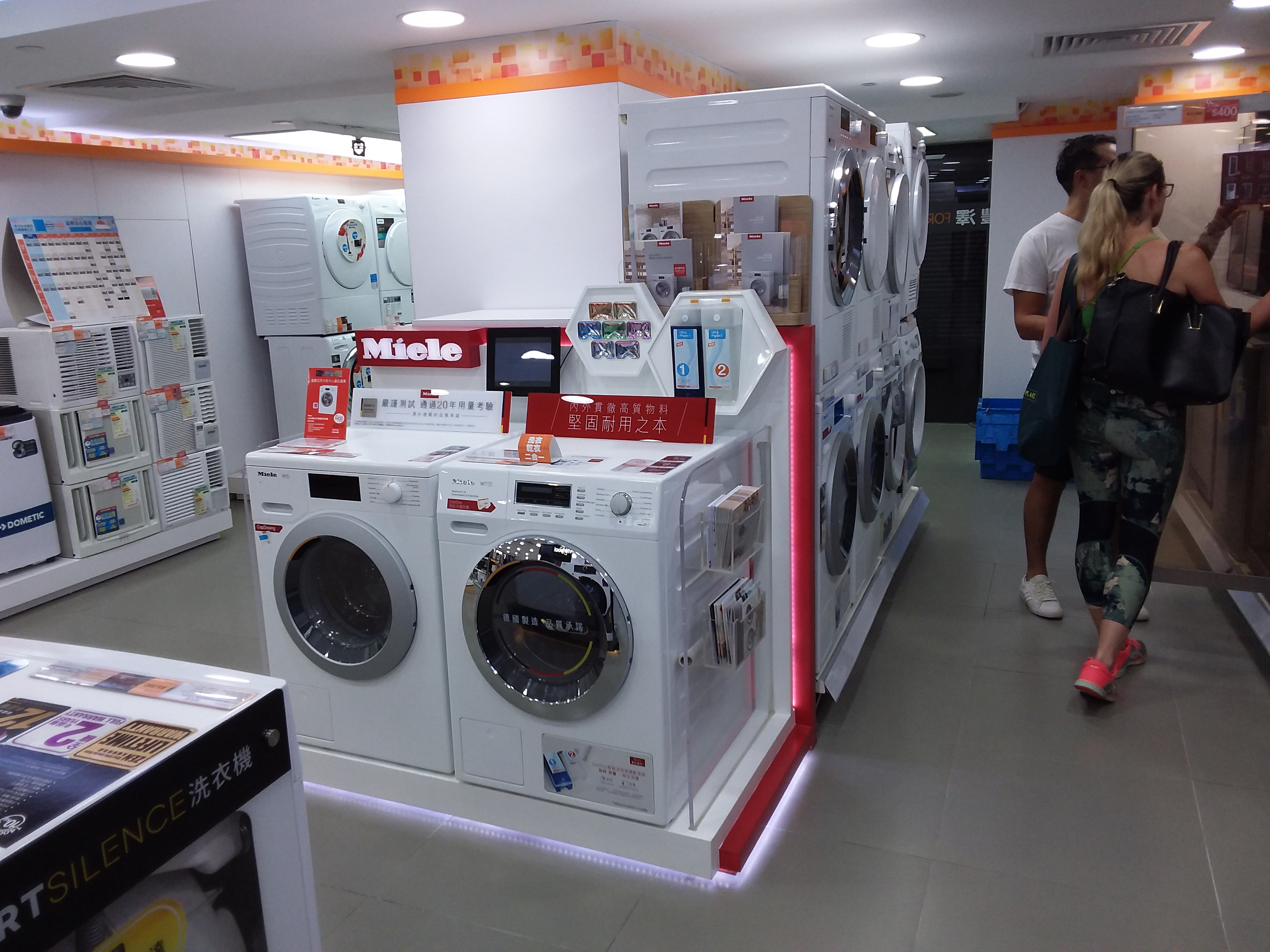
A selection of major appliances at Fortress department store at Melbourne Plaza, Hong Kong in March 2019

A major appliance is a non-portable or semi-portable machine used for routine housekeeping tasks such as cooking, washing laundry, or food preservation. Such appliances are sometimes collectively known as white goods, as the products were traditionally white in color, although a variety of colors are now available. An appliance is different from a plumbing fixture because it uses electricity or fuel.

Major appliances differ from small appliances because they are bigger and not portable. They are often considered fixtures and part of real estate and as such they are often supplied to tenants as part of otherwise unfurnished rental properties. Major appliances may have special electrical connections, connections to gas supplies, or special plumbing and ventilation arrangements that may be permanently connected to the appliance. This limits where they can be placed in a home.

Since major appliances in a home consume a significant amount of energy, they have become the objectives of programs to improve their energy efficiency in many countries. Increasing energy efficiency is often described as an important element of climate change mitigation alongside other improvements like retrofitting buildings to increase building performance. Energy efficiency improvements may require changes in construction of the appliances, or improved control systems. Starting in the 1990s major appliances such as washing machines and air conditioners started to incorporate fuzzy logic-based controls, replacing electromechanical controls such as wash timers in washing machines. These controls incorporated microcontrollers and sensors to control appliance operation at reduced cost while allowing the microcontroller to adjust appliance operation in real time without human intervention, resulting in improved appliance performance.

== Terminology ==
They are also known as a large domestic appliance or large electric appliance or simply a large appliance, large domestic, or large electric.

== Brands ==
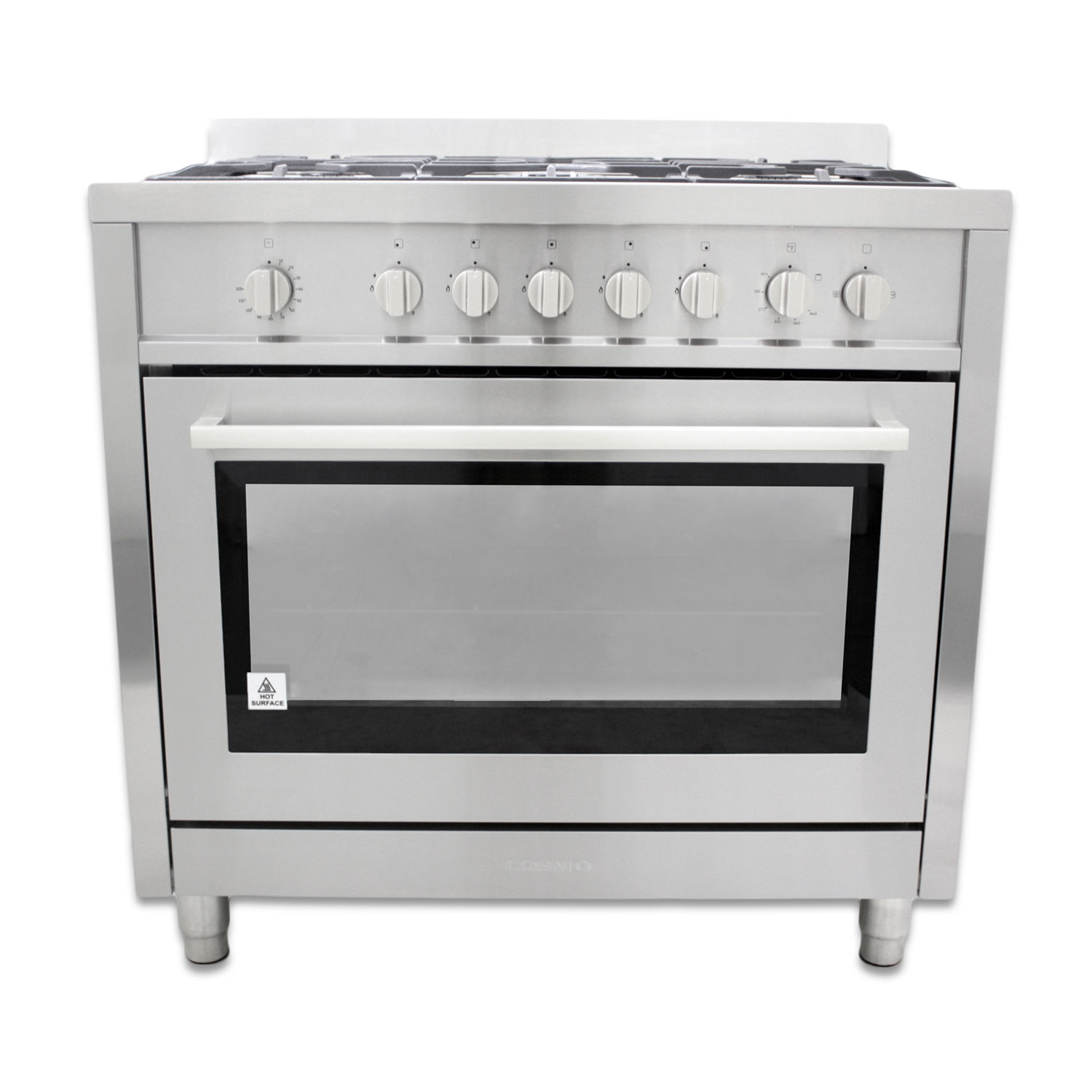
A modern gas stove

In the early days of electrification, many major consumer appliances were made by the same companies that made the generation and distribution equipment. While some of these brand names persist to the present day, even if only as licensed use of old popular brand names, today many major appliances are manufactured by companies or divisions of companies that specialize in particular appliances.

== Types ==
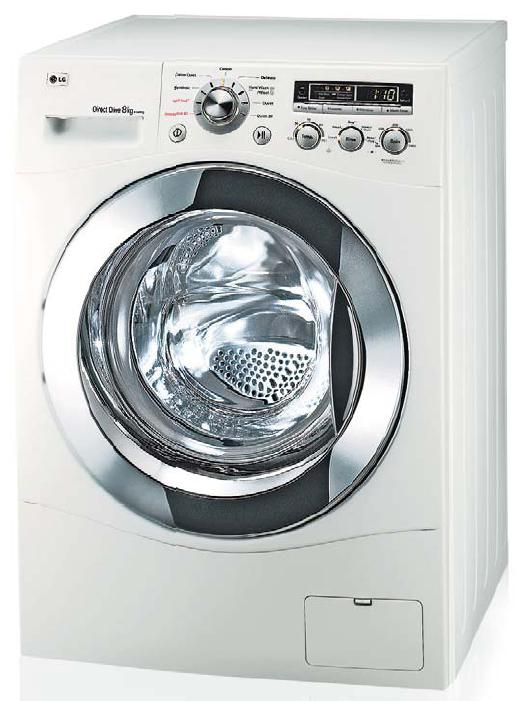
A modern front-loading washing machine

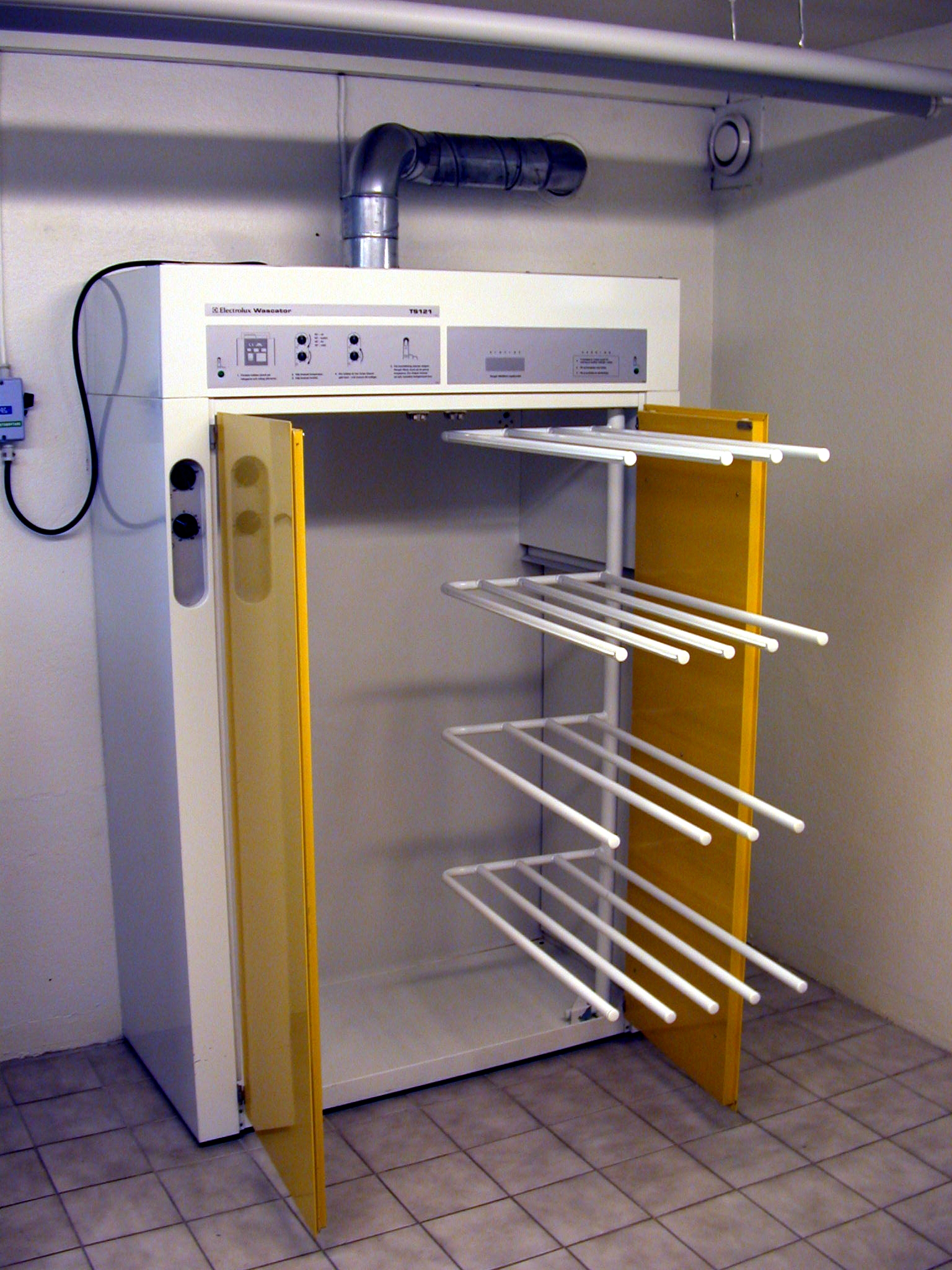
A drying cabinet

Major appliances may be roughly divided as follows:

- Refrigeration equipment
  - Freezer
  - Refrigerator
  - Water cooler
  - Ice maker
- Cooking
  - Kitchen stove, also known as a range, cooker, oven, cooking plate, or cooktop
  - Wall oven
- Washing and drying equipment
  - Washing machine
  - Clothes dryer
  - Drying cabinet
  - Dishwasher
- Heating and cooling
  - Air conditioner
  - Furnace
  - Water heater
  - Central heating system

== Efficiency ==
Modern appliances, such as, freezers, ovens, stoves, dishwashers, clothes washers and dryers, use significantly less energy than older appliances. Current energy-efficient refrigerators, for example, use 40 percent less energy than conventional models did in 2001. Following this, if all households in Europe changed their more than ten-year-old appliances into new ones, 20 billion kWh of electricity would be saved annually, hence reducing CO_{2} emissions by almost 18 billion kg. In the US, the corresponding figures would be 17 billion kWh of electricity and 27,000,000,000 lb (1.2×10^{10} kg) CO_{2}. According to a 2009 study from McKinsey & Company the replacement of old appliances is one of the most efficient global measures to reduce emissions of greenhouse gases. Modern power management systems also reduce energy usage by idle appliances by turning them off or putting them into a low-energy mode after a certain time. Many countries identify energy-efficient appliances using energy input labeling.

The impact of energy efficiency on peak demand depends on when the appliance is used. For example, an air conditioner uses more energy during the afternoon when it is hot. Therefore, an energy-efficient air conditioner will have a larger impact on peak demand than off-peak demand. An energy-efficient dishwasher, on the other hand, uses more energy during the late evening when people do their dishes. This appliance may have little to no impact on peak demand.

Over the period 2001–2021, tech companies have replaced traditional silicon switches in an electric circuit with quicker gallium nitride transistors to make new gadgets as energy efficient as feasible. Gallium nitride transistors are, however, more costly. This is a significant change in lowering the carbon footprint.

== See also ==
- Small appliances
- Domestic technology
- Home automation (domotics)
- E-waste
- Household chore
- List of cooking appliances
- List of home appliances
- List of stoves
- Yellow, red and orange goods
- Black goods
