= Staber Industries =

Staber Industries, Inc. is a manufacturer of residential laundry home appliances, with headquarters in Groveport, Ohio. The products they currently manufacture include a washing machine, a clothes dryer, and a clothes drying cabinet.

== History ==
Staber Industries, Inc. was founded in 1976 by James E. Staber. For the first two decades, the company's specialization was the remanufacturing of washing machine transmissions for such companies as Whirlpool, G.E., Maytag, and Speed Queen.

== Appliance manufacturing ==
In the 1990s, Staber Industries began to shift its resources to the development of its own line of residential laundry appliances. The current product line includes a high efficiency top-loading horizontal-axis washing machine, a clothes dryer, and a clothes drying cabinet.

=== Washing machine ===
The Staber washing machine is the only top loaded horizontal-axis washing machine to be manufactured in the United States. The horizontal-axis configuration uses approximately 60% less water for a wash cycle than a traditional top loading washer. Because of this, the Staber washing machine has earned an Energy Star rating for high efficiency.

The wash tub is hexagonal and constructed of laser-perforated stainless steel, spinning above a half-octagonal stainless steel base. Because the distance between the spinning tub and the base is in constant flux, water is force-injected through the perforations into the clothes. Staber Industries received a patent for this wash tub configuration in 1994.

=== Distribution ===
Staber appliances are available domestically and internationally to consumers by way of their online store, and also through a network of hundreds of authorized dealers throughout the United States and Canada.
