= IFB Home Appliances =

Indian home appliances company

IFB Appliances
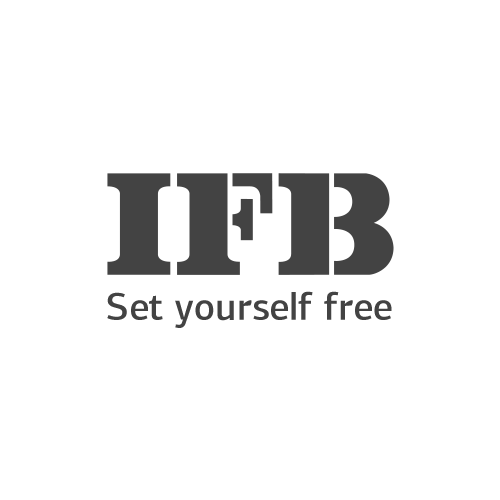
- Company type: Public
- Traded as: NSE: IFBIND; BSE: 505726
- Industry: Home appliances
- Founded: 1974; 52 years ago
- Founder: Bijon Nag
- Headquarters: Kolkata, India
- Area served: Worldwide
- Products: Washing Machines, Refrigerators, Air Conditioners, Microwave Ovens, Hobs, Chimneys, Dishwashers, Clothes Dryers
- Website: www.ifbappliances.com

IFB Home Appliances is an Indian home appliances company and a division of IFB Industries. It has its manufacturing locations in Kolkata and Verna, Goa. The company has a chain of ~530 retail outlets called ‘IFB Point’.

== History ==
Originally IFB Industries was known as Indian Fine Blanks Ltd and started operations in India in 1974 in collaboration with Heinrich Schmid AG of Switzerland. In 1989, it entered an agreement with Bosch-Siemens Hausgerate to produce fully-automatic washing machines and other domestic appliances. The Home Appliances Division started in 1990-91. The factory is based at Verna Industrial Estate, Verna, Goa, India and Visveswariah Industrial Estate, Bengaluru, India.

== Products ==
The company currently offers products for laundry, kitchen, living and industrial purposes along with additives and accessories. It offers appliances such as washing machines, washer-dryers, laundry dryers, dishwashers, microwave ovens, air conditioners, Refrigerators , hobs, chimneys and other cooking appliances.
