= IFB =

IFB may refer to:

- Illinois Farm Bureau
- Independent Fundamental Baptist, Independent Baptist Christian congregations
- Institute of Forest Biodiversity, Indian research agency
- International Freedom Battalion in the Syrian Civil War started in 2011
- Interruptible foldback (or interruptible feedback), electronic monitoring in TV and filmmaking
- Instituto Federal de Brasília (Federal Institute of Brasília), an institute of technology in Brazil
- Irish Film Board (now Fís Éireann/Screen Ireland), Irish film production agency
- IFB Home Appliances, India
- Independent Forward Bloc, a political party in Mauritius
- Invitation for bid, a formal letter for generating competing proposals
