= Drying room =

Room intended for drying of objects

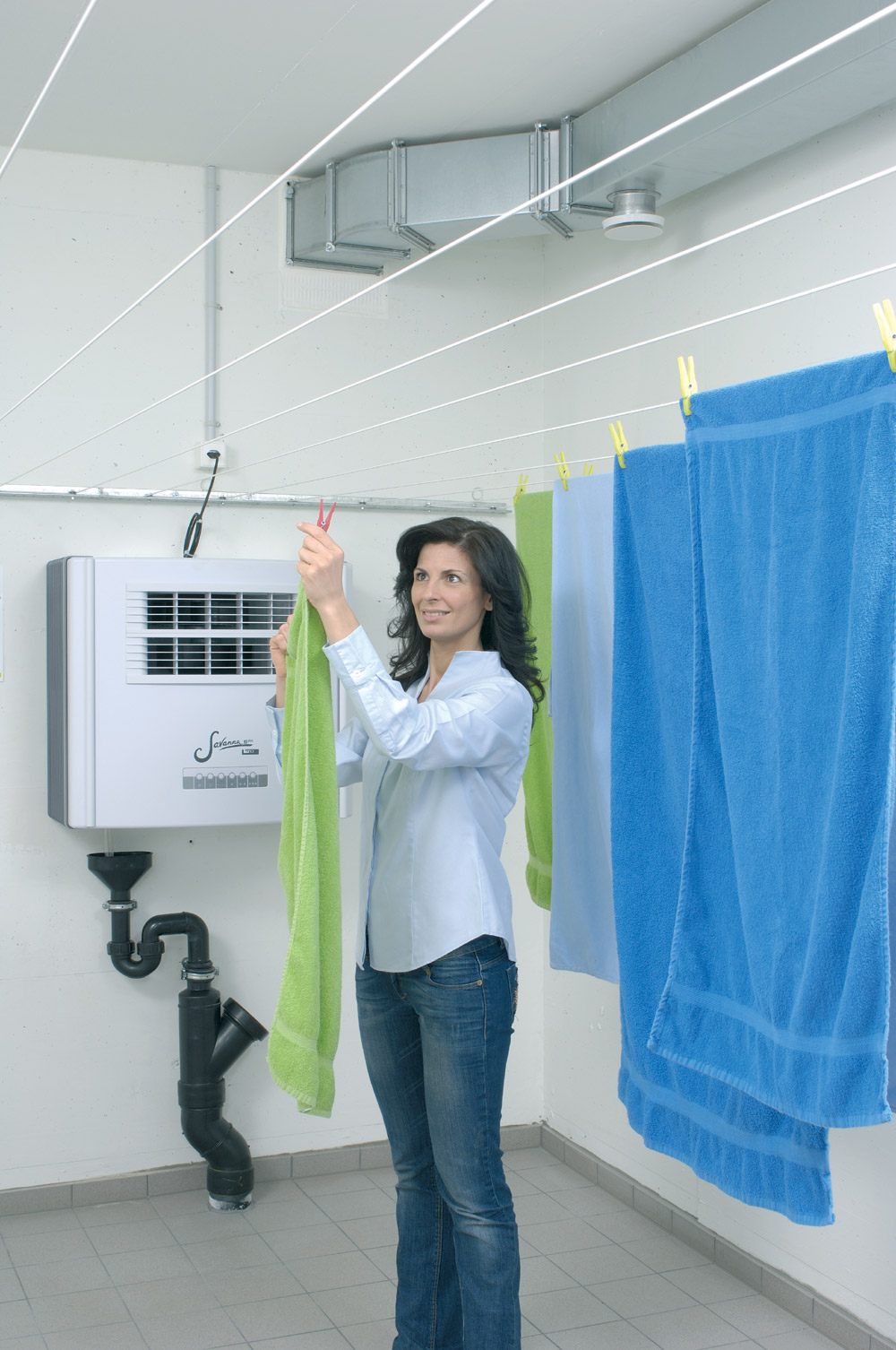
Laundry hung on a clothes line in a drying room (dehumidifier in the background and duct for ventilation in the ceiling)

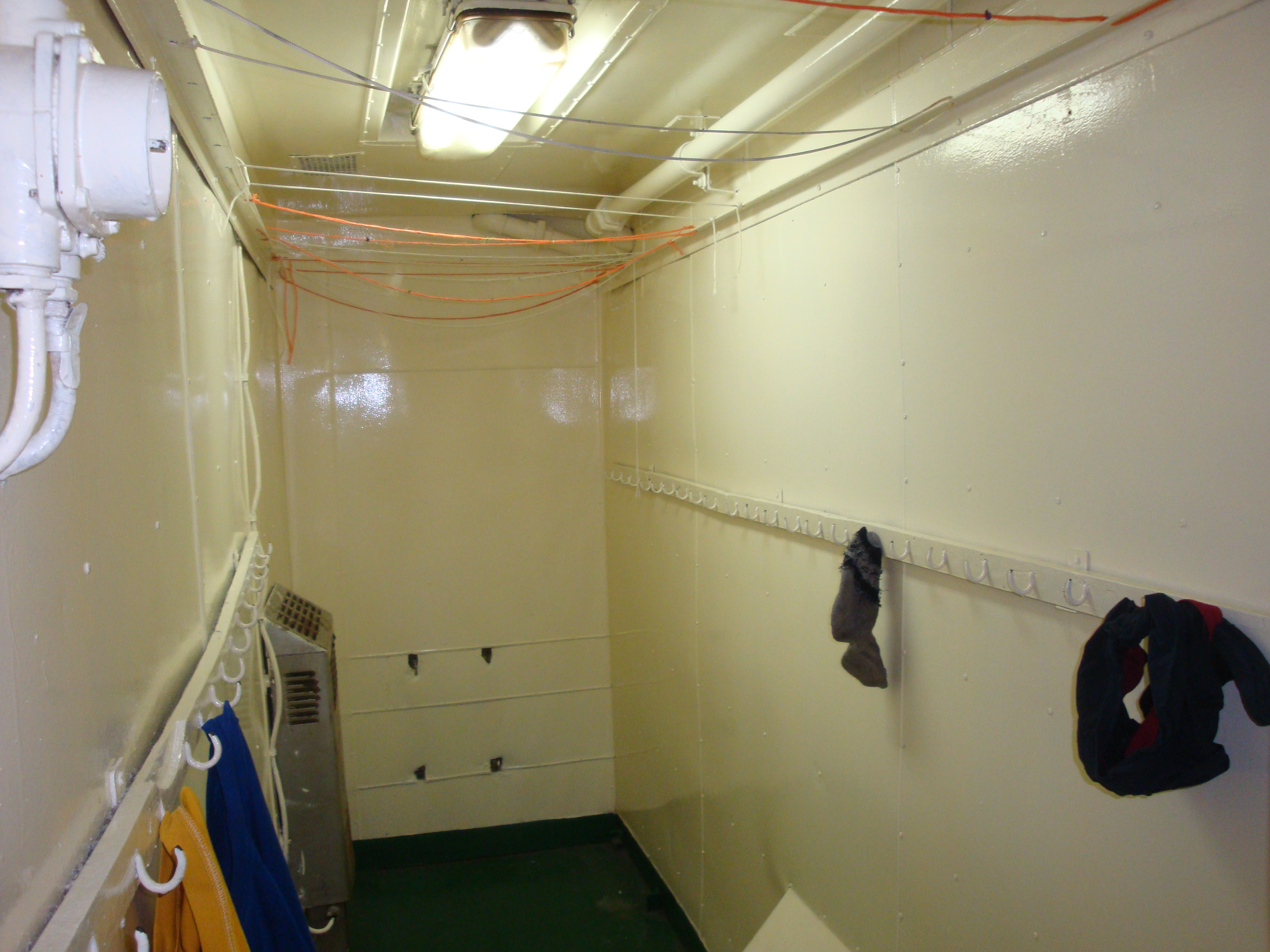
Drying room with clothes pegs on the walls and clotheslines in the ceiling

A drying room is a room intended for drying objects. It can act as a replacement or complement for drying cabinets, tumble-dryers, and outdoor drying. Compared to outdoor drying, a drying room means one usually does not have to consider the weather forecast in case of rain.

In industrial operations, drying rooms are used for drying various materials for several purposes such as the manufacture of products made of wood and paper, as well as the production of food, pharmaceuticals, and ceramic industries.

In households, drying rooms are typically used for newly washed clothes, wet training clothes, and any outerwear and are often connected to a laundry room. They can also be found in connection with changing rooms, especially for commuters in commercial buildings. A simple drying room can have clotheslines to hang clothes on, for example, at 30–40 cm intervals. In Japan, a heated bathroom is often a laundry drying room.

A drying room can be a living area if, for example, it is combined with a bathroom, or a storage or utility room if it is primarily a technical room or a wardrobe.

== History ==
On farms and manors in older times, dried fruit, flax, and other agricultural products were dried over an open fire, which increased the risk of fire, and separate buildings for such purposes are said to have been constructed on farms or manors at a sufficient distance from other buildings. Brewhouses may be an example of this.

Many cabins, kindergartens and workplaces where there are a lot of wet clothes commonly have drying rooms. Some housing associations have drying rooms in common areas, but many new small apartments do not have drying rooms due to lack of available area.

== Modes of operation ==
The drying mechanisms used in drying rooms can be classified according to:

- Drying medium: Hot air, smoke, inert gas, superheated steam
- Operating pressure: Atmospheric pressure, constant pressure, pulsating pressure, vacuum drying, positive pressure drying
- Method of heat transfer: Conventional convection (indirect), contact drying (direct), ultrasonic, microwave, infrared, ultraviolet, dielectric or electric resistance drying.
- Desiccant flow method:
  - What is being dried stands still or has occasional movements (for example, a clothes horse)
  - The source of movement is the motion of what is being dried (tumble-dryer)
  - The source of movement of the dried material is mainly the kinetic energy of the drying medium
  - Mechanical transport, i.e., that the dried material is moved mechanically
    - Linear motion (belt, rollers, chain, screw, vibration, rake dryer)
    - Rotational movement (tumble dryer)
- Frequency: Periodic drying or continuous drying
- Installation method: Fixed or mobile

=== Ventilation ===
In climates with dry air, natural ventilation can be used to replace moist indoor air with dry outdoor air.

=== Heat ===
Some drying rooms have hot air systems, which are energy-intensive and often entail larger operating costs. The heated air is circulated in the room before it is vented out through ducts. It can be assumed that the energy consumption of drying clothes with heating in this way is several times more expensive than washing clothes.

=== Dehumidification ===
Drying rooms can be equipped with a dehumidifier that circulates and dehumidifies the air in the room and provides some heating in the form of waste heat. This can be much more energy efficient than solutions based on heating and ventilation. For the dehumidifier to work effectively it can be beneficial to have a lot of air movement within the room.

== Special drying rooms ==
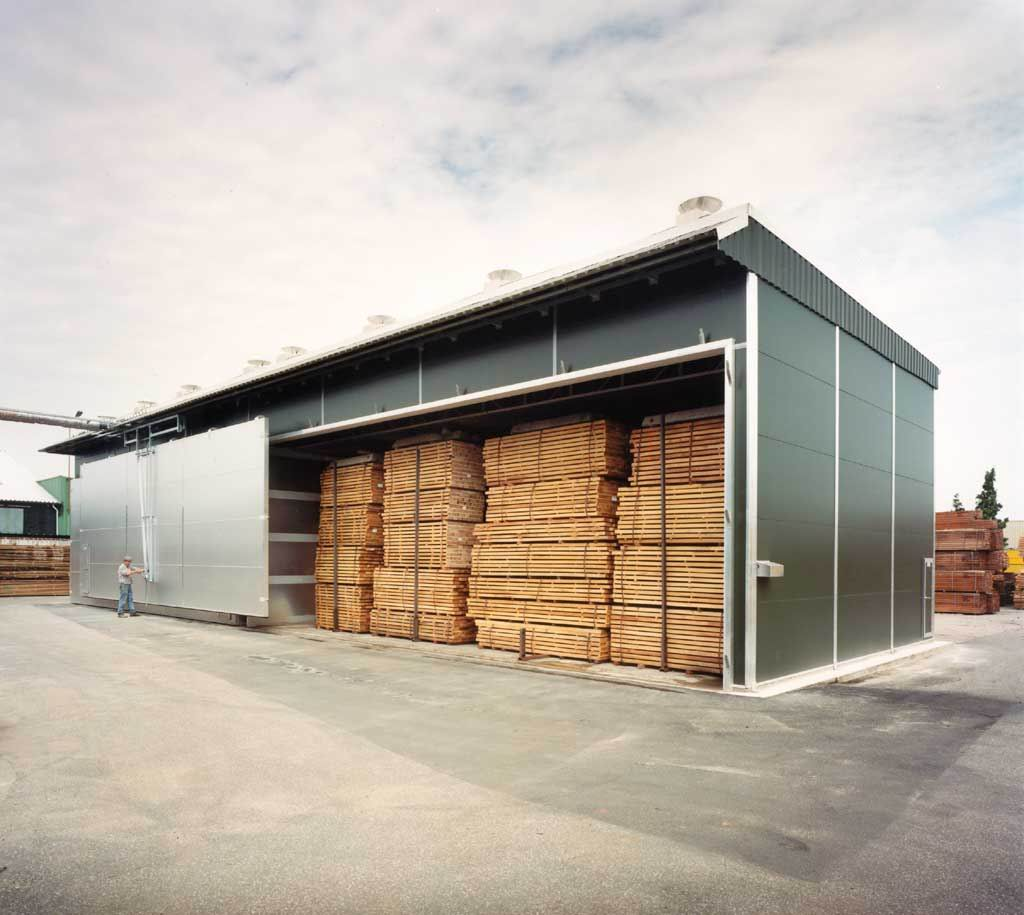
Building for drying of wood

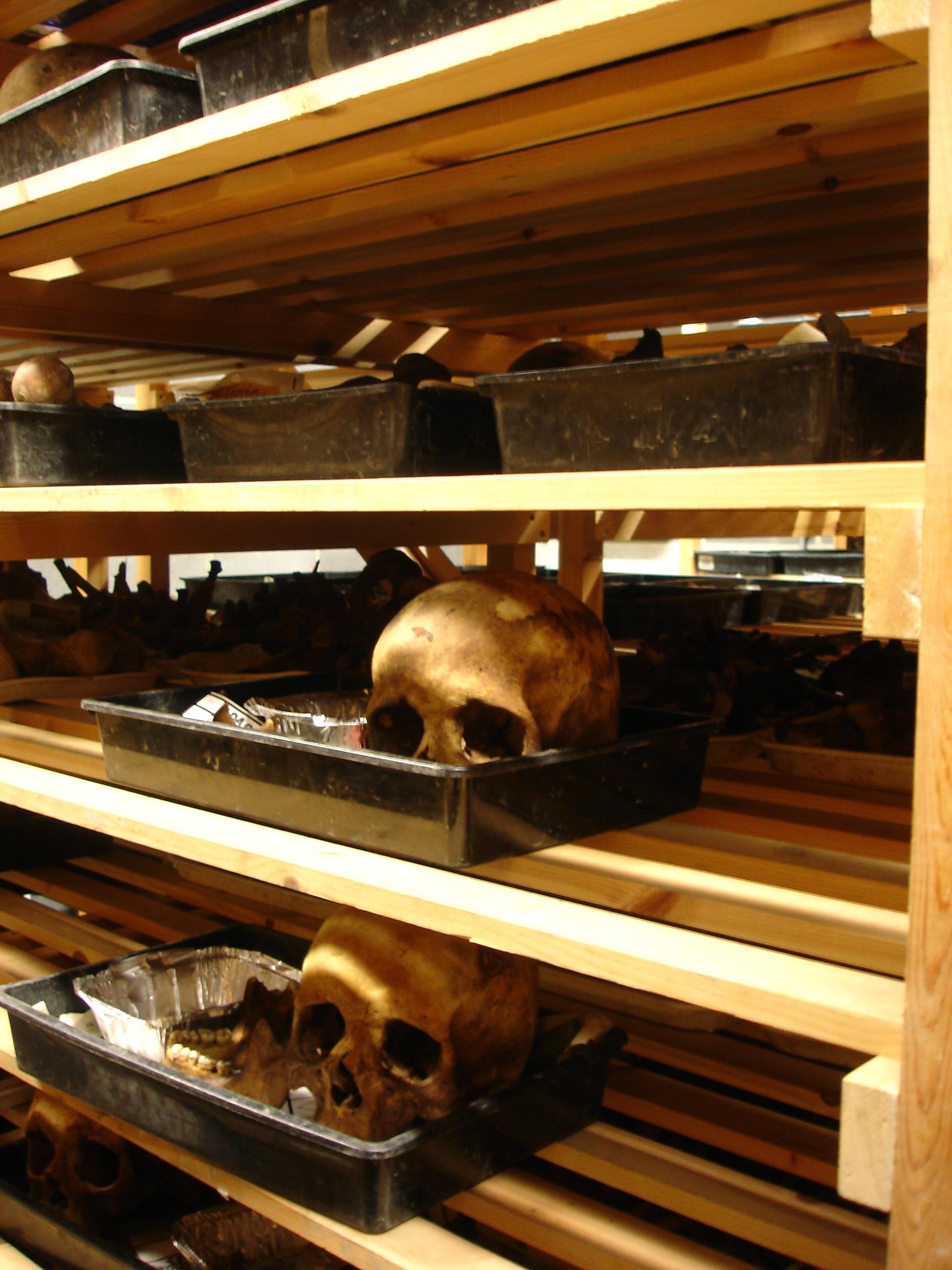
Drying room for skeleton parts

Various drying rooms exist for specific items, such as clothes, art, wood, or food. Large drying rooms are sometimes used in the industry, for example, in producing timber products. In an industrial context, it can also be mentioned that stockfish are dried outdoors.

== See also ==
- Shoe dryer
- Wood drying
