= Azuma Leasing =

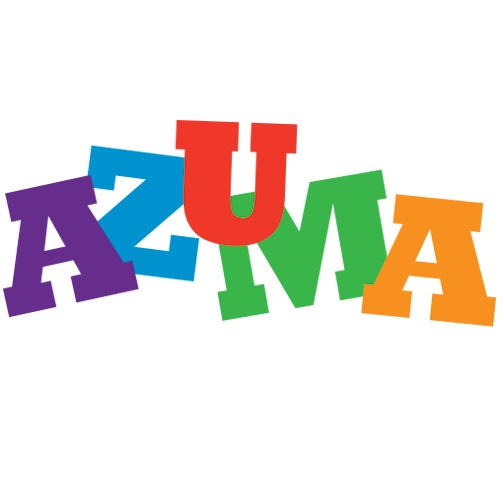
AZUMA Leasing Logo from 2015.

Azuma Leasing is a leasing company headquartered in Austin, Texas. The company leases Washers and Dryers to residential and commercial customers in 26 U.S. metropolitan markets.

David Newberger founded Azuma as a startup company in 1993. He sought competitive advantage by installing washers and dryers directly to apartment residents as a service amenity. In 2003, Azuma quadrupled its business by acquiring the appliance leasing contracts of Web Service Company, based in Redondo Beach, California. In 2017, AZUMA decided to expand their business ventures into leasing furniture and housewares with the sale of the appliance business over to Appliance Warehouse. In 2022 AZUMA re-established its Washer and Dryer rentals business and now solely focuses on appliance leasing and has exited the furniture and houseware business.
