= Drying cabinet =

Same as a clothes dryer, but does not move the items placed inside it

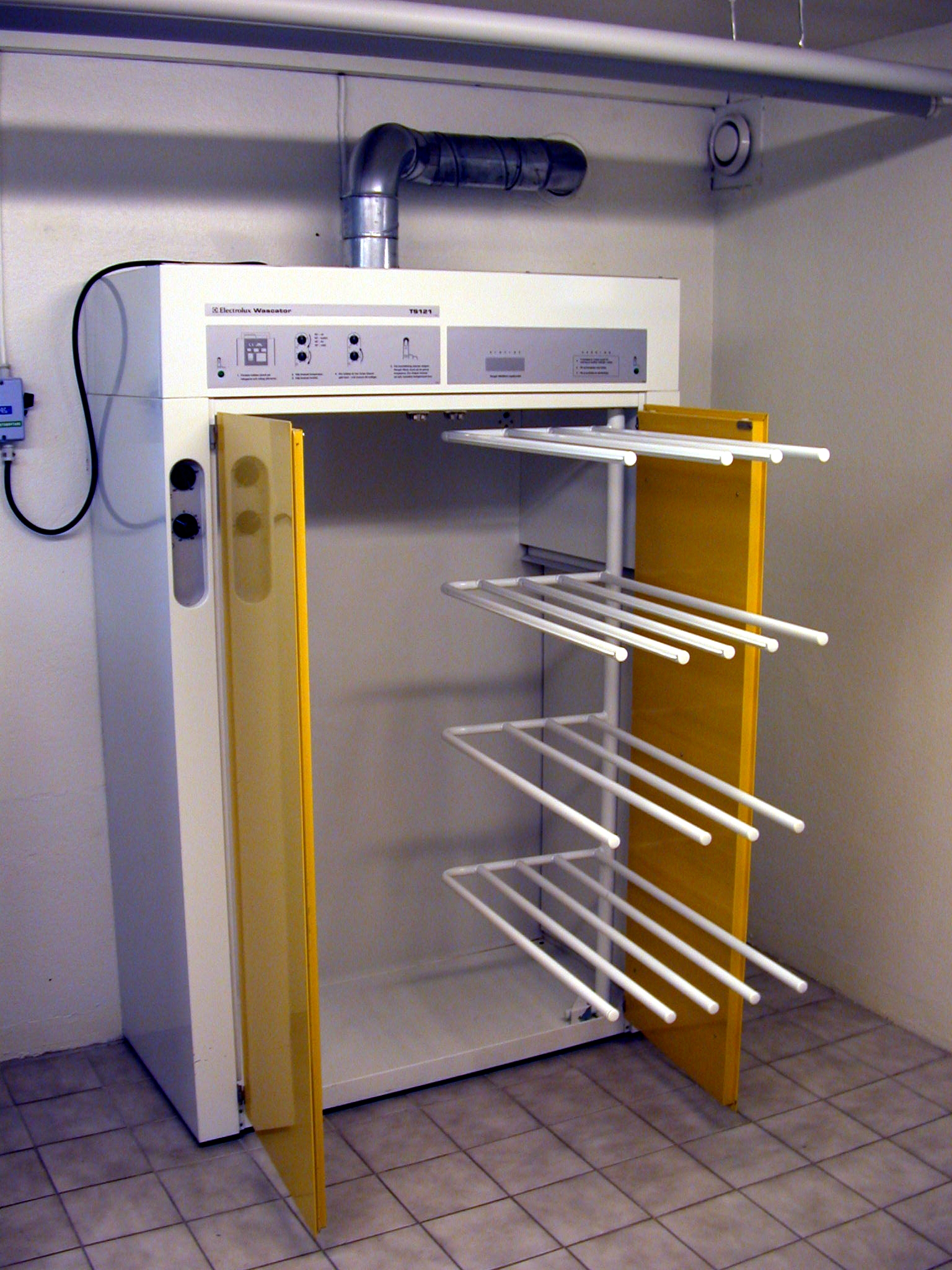
A drying cabinet

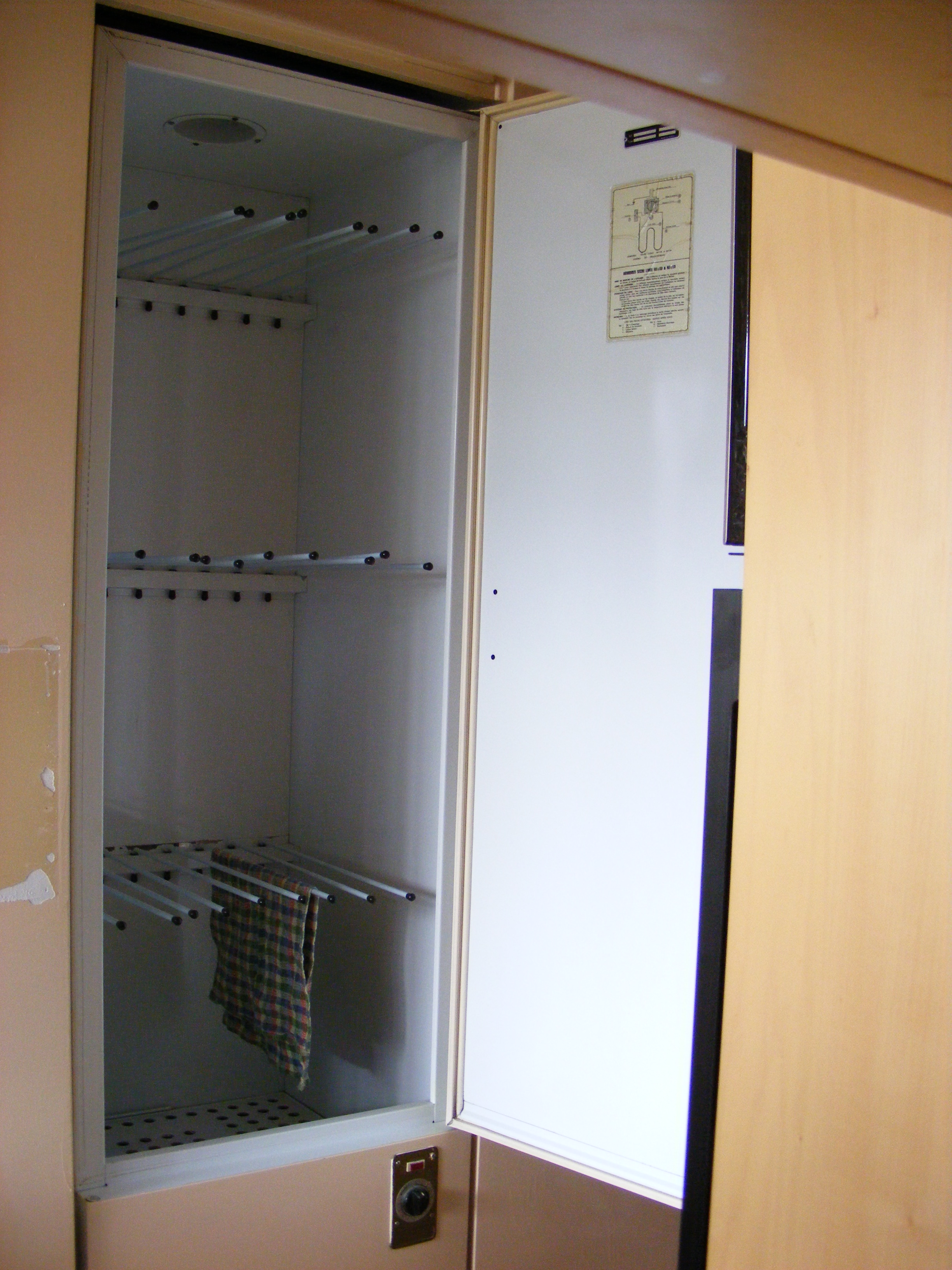
A domestic drying cabinet

A drying cabinet is today usually an electrical machine designed to expedite the drying of items - usually clothing - that are unsuitable for a mechanical clothes dryer. Such items may include delicate clothing care labeled as "hang dry", "dry flat" or "do not tumble dry" on their wash instructions, as well as items such as comforters, boots and coats.

== History ==
In both Europe and America, wealthier and commercial properties sometimes had drying cabinets or drying rooms associated with their laundry rooms. The cabinets were of wood or cast iron, with a series of drying racks on wheels which were pulled in or out of the cabinet horizontally. The cabinet was heated by coal, gas or wood. The Shaker community still uses these cabinets. See also Airing Cupboard. However these cabinets and cupboards were intended for the general drying of laundry, whereas the modern cabinets are usually intended for items of clothing unsuitable for a traditional clothes dryer.

=== Europe ===
Since the 1980s, drying cabinets have been common in European laundromats, especially in the tvättstuga – a laundry room in Swedish housing cooperatives. With the large size of the drying cabinets and relatively small size of European homes, drying cabinets have been almost exclusively found in self-service laundry facilities.

=== United States ===
With the steadily increasing size of American homes in the last half of the 20th century, the laundry room increased in size and functionality as well. To meet the increasing demand for luxury appliances in the US residential market, a handful of home appliance manufacturers (including Asko and Staber) have begun to supply drying cabinets for the home. A typical residential drying cabinet is approximately the size of a narrow refrigerator, and is used to supplement traditional tumble dryers.

== Industrial use ==
Drying cabinets are particularly useful in industrial applications for the quick drying of wet weather clothing such as that worn by emergency services like fire fighters. Clothing can be dried in one hour. A boot rack can also be fitted.

== See also ==
- Shoe dryer
- Drying room
