= Curio cabinet =

Type of display case

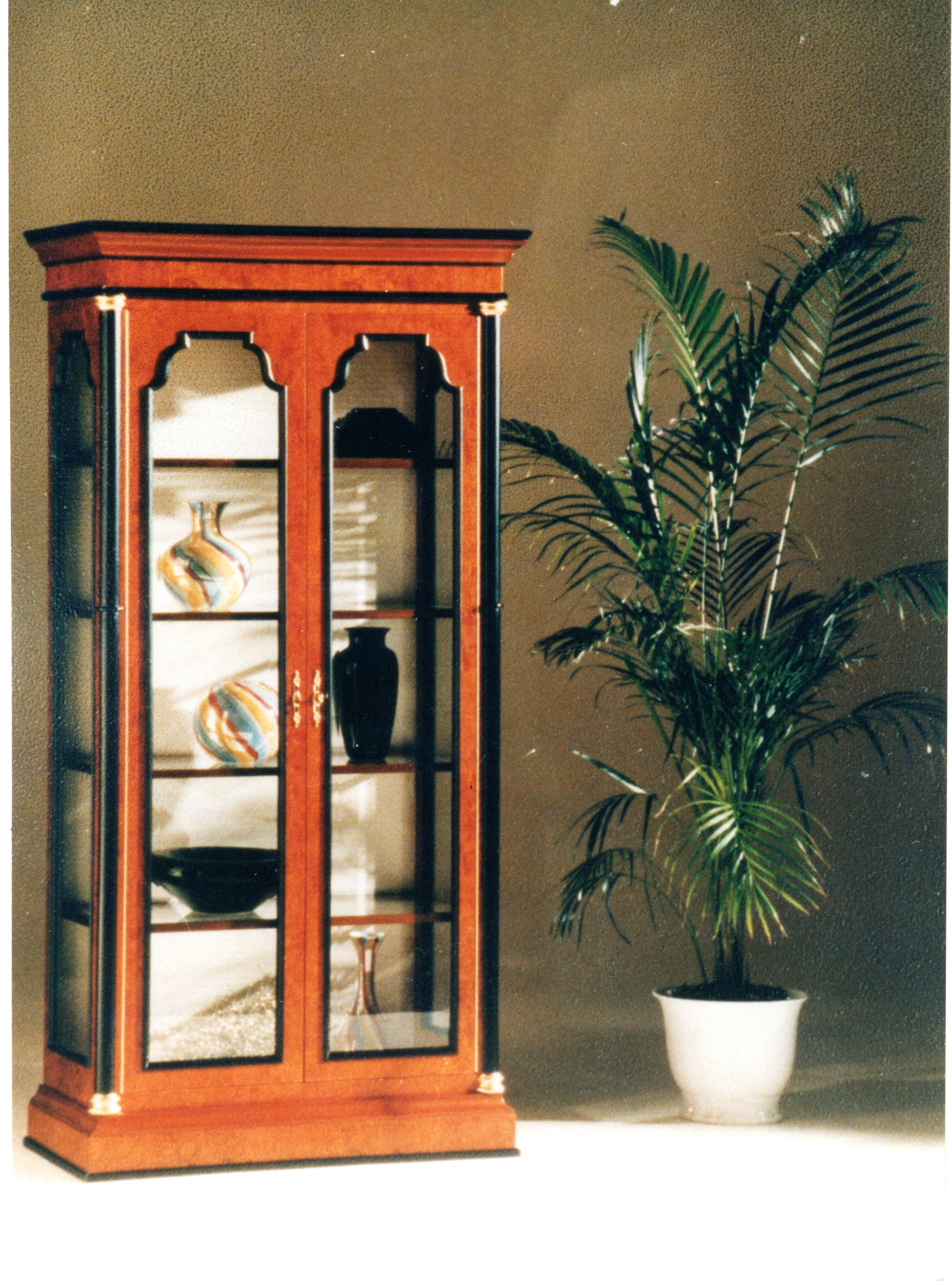
A curio cabinet with vases.

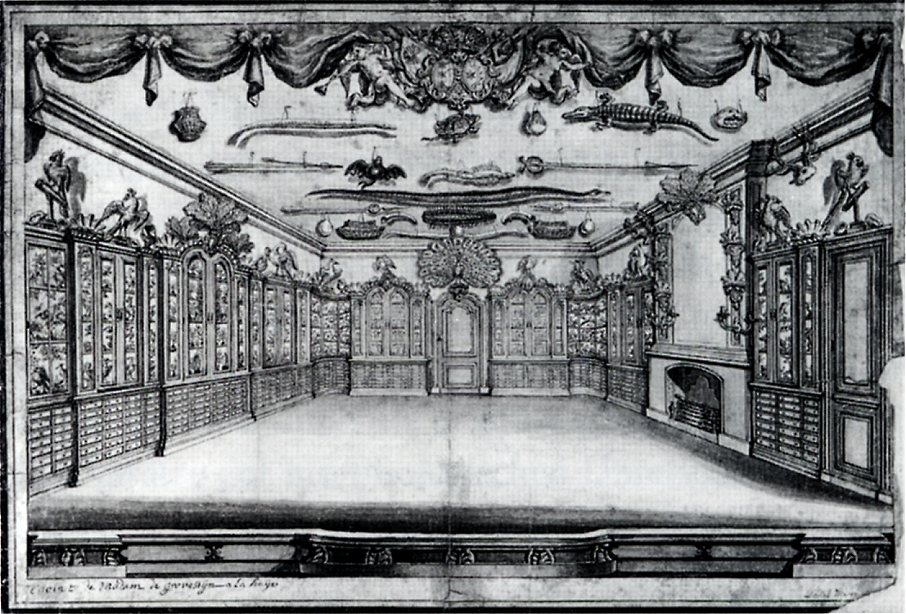
Curio cabinets of Catharina, wife of Douwe Sirtema van Grovestins

A curio cabinet is a specialised type of display case, made predominantly of glass with a metal or wood framework, for presenting collections of curios, like figurines or other interesting objects that invoke curiosity, and perhaps share a common theme. A curio cabinet may also be used to display a solitary object of special interest, such as a hand-crafted doll.

== Overview ==
While display cases for presenting products for sale (such as jewelry) are typically horizontal with a surface covered in felt, a curio cabinet is usually vertical with no felt. Most curio cabinets have glass on each side, glass shelves, and optionally a mirror at the back, to maximize visibility.

Another purpose of a curio cabinet is to protect the value of a collection, which it does by preventing contact by dust and vermin. For added security, a locked door or removable panel allows the collection to be seen, while protecting it from damage and theft.

== See also ==
- Stationery cabinet
- Cabinet of curiosities
