= Cupboard =

Furniture enclosing items stored in a home

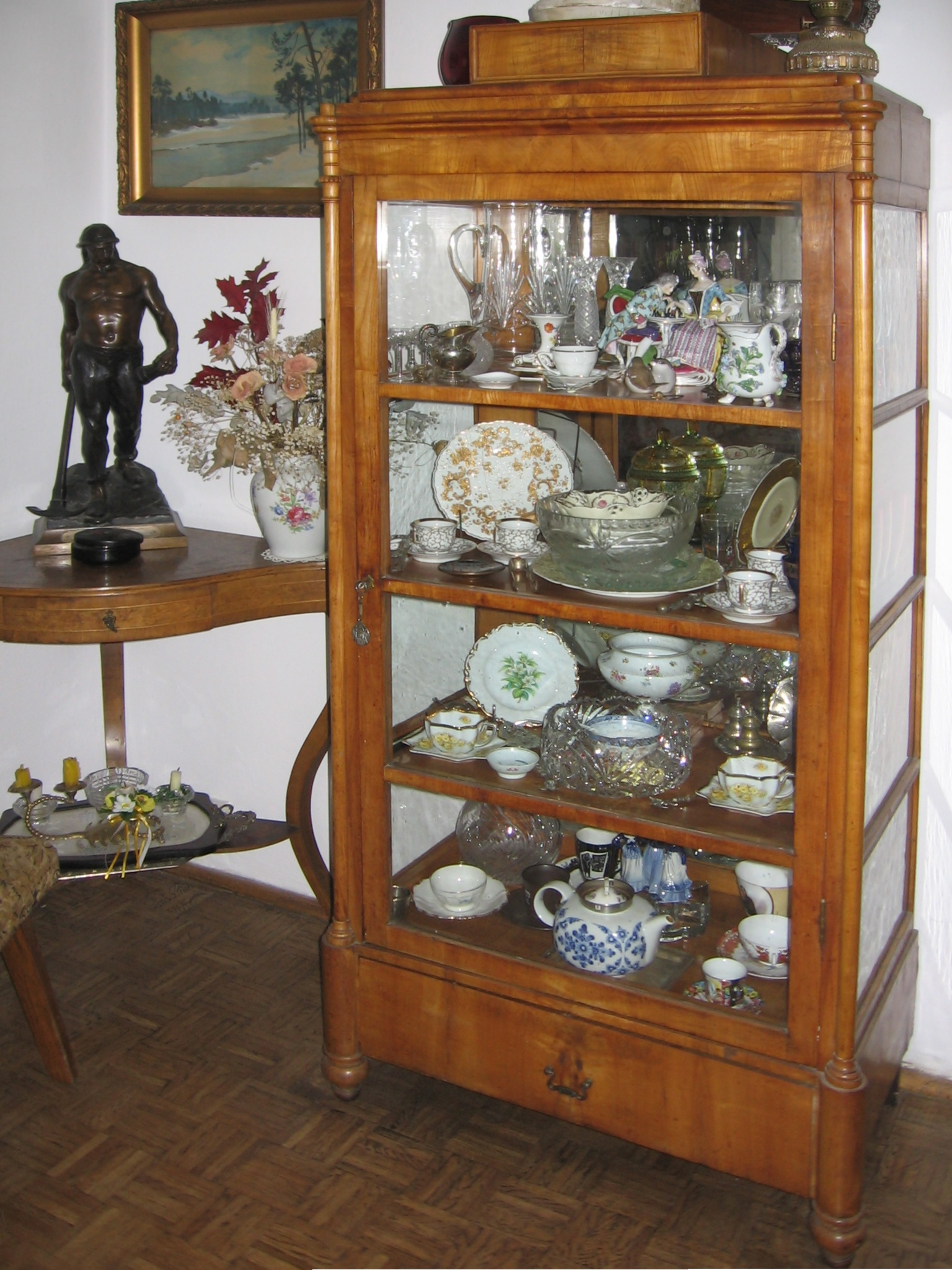
Antique cupboard (right): Decorative crockery and bibelots in vitré armoire or vitrina

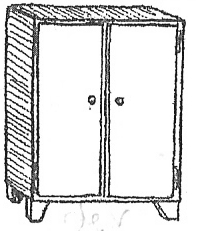
Illustration of a closed cupboard

A cupboard is a piece of furniture for enclosing dishware or grocery items that are stored in a home. The term is sometimes also used for any form of cabinet or enclosed bookcase. It gradually evolved from its original meaning: an open-shelved side table for displaying dishware, more specifically plates, cups and saucers. These open cupboards typically had between one and three display tiers, and at the time, a drawer or multiple drawers fitted to them.

== Types of cupboards ==
=== Airing cupboard ===
An airing cupboard (or hot press) is a built-in storage space, sometimes of walk-in dimensions, containing a water heater, either an immersion heater for hot running water or a boiler for central heating water (hence, also "boiler cupboard"), or a hot water storage tank. Shelves, usually slatted to allow for circulation of heat, are positioned above or around the heater to provide room for clothing. The purpose is to allow air to circulate around the stored fabrics to keep them dry.

Some variants of airing cupboards also serve as the linen cupboard, the storing area of the household's clean sheets and towels.

In another version, the airing cupboard serves as a temporary drying space, either for laundry or for wet outdoor clothes and shoes. Its shelves can be used to fully remove traces of damp from dried clothing before the items are put away elsewhere in drawers and wardrobes. A moveable electrical version of this is a drying cabinet.

=== Built-in cupboard ===
A built-in cupboard is a storage space that forms part of the design of the room and is not free-standing or moving. It is not the same as a cabinet. In the United Kingdom, houses often have a built-in cupboard under the stairs.

=== Linen cupboard ===
A linen cupboard is an enclosed recess of a room used for storing household linen (e.g. sheets, towels, tablecloths) and other things for storage, usually with shelves, or a free-standing piece of furniture for this purpose.

=== Stationery cupboard ===
Most offices have a lockable repository for valuables. The heart of this is usually the supply of stationery.

== Gallery ==
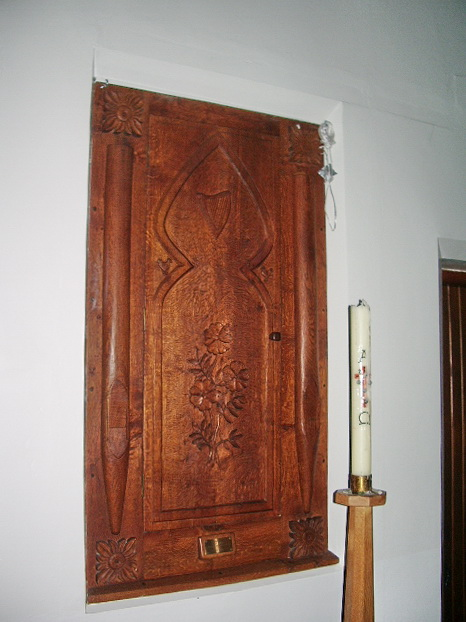
Built-in cupboard: A cupboard built into the wall of St James's Church, Whitechapel, Lancashire

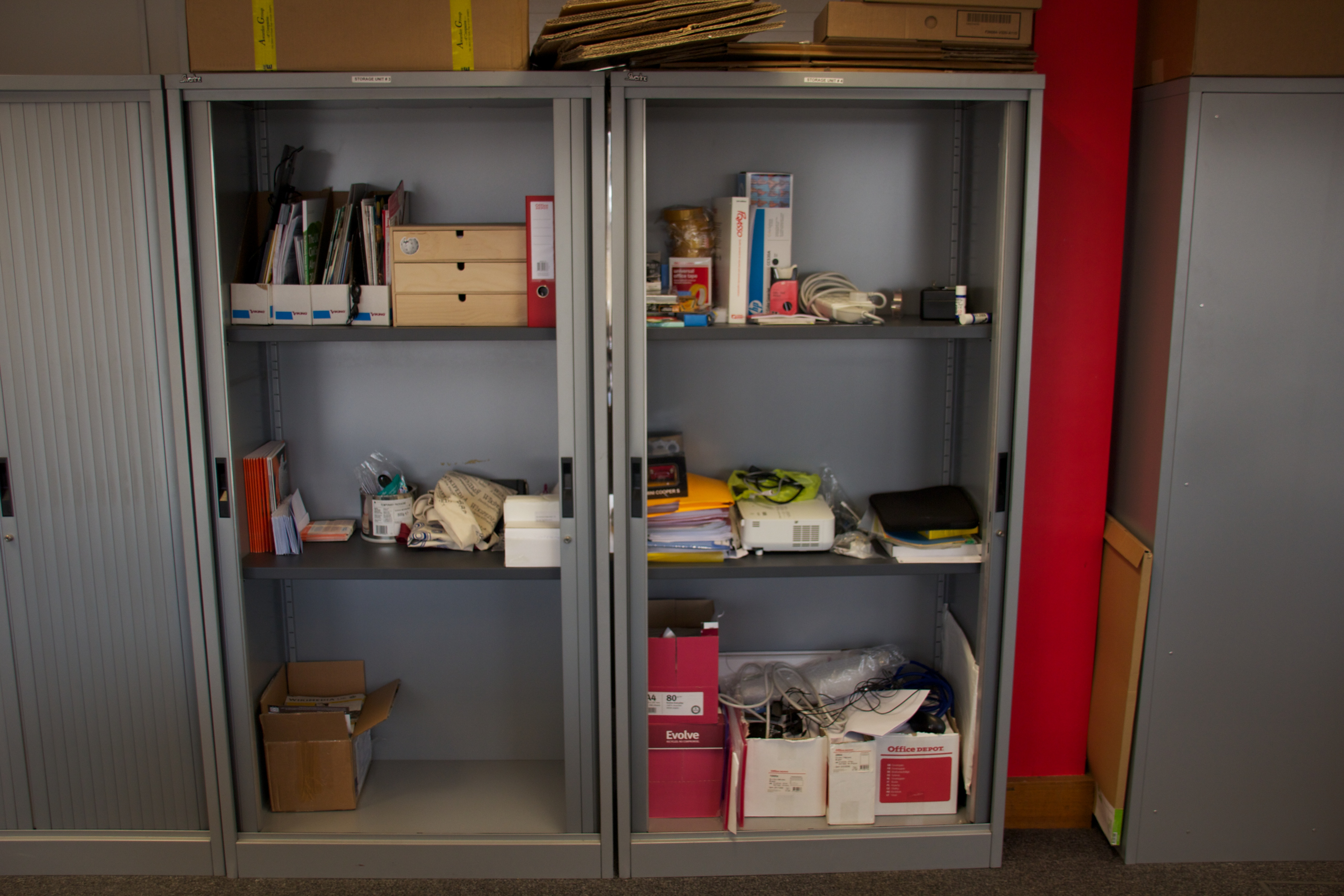
Stationery cupboard: An office stationery cupboard, with its lockable doors open

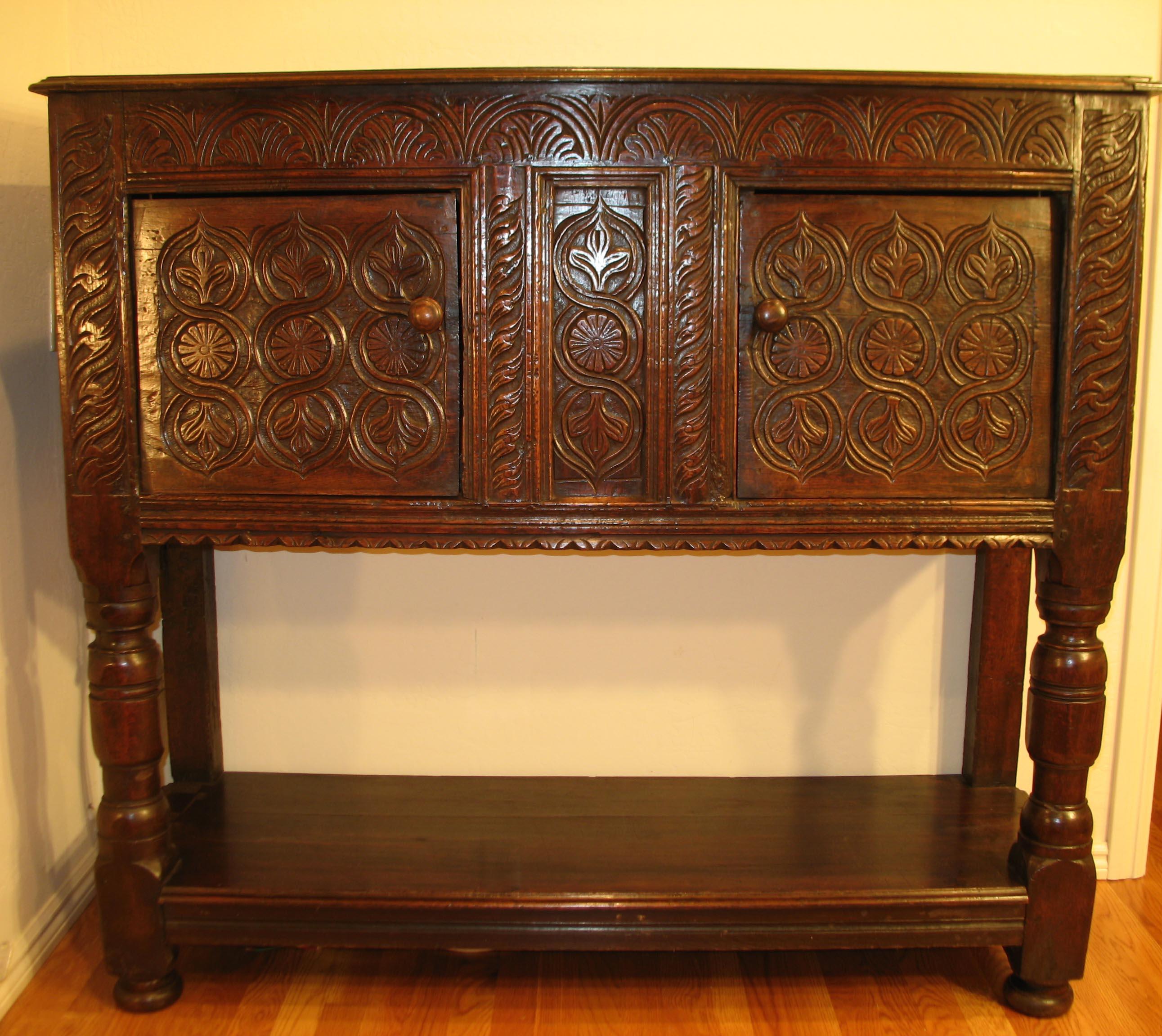
Antique cupboard: English livery cupboard approximately 1600 to 1640

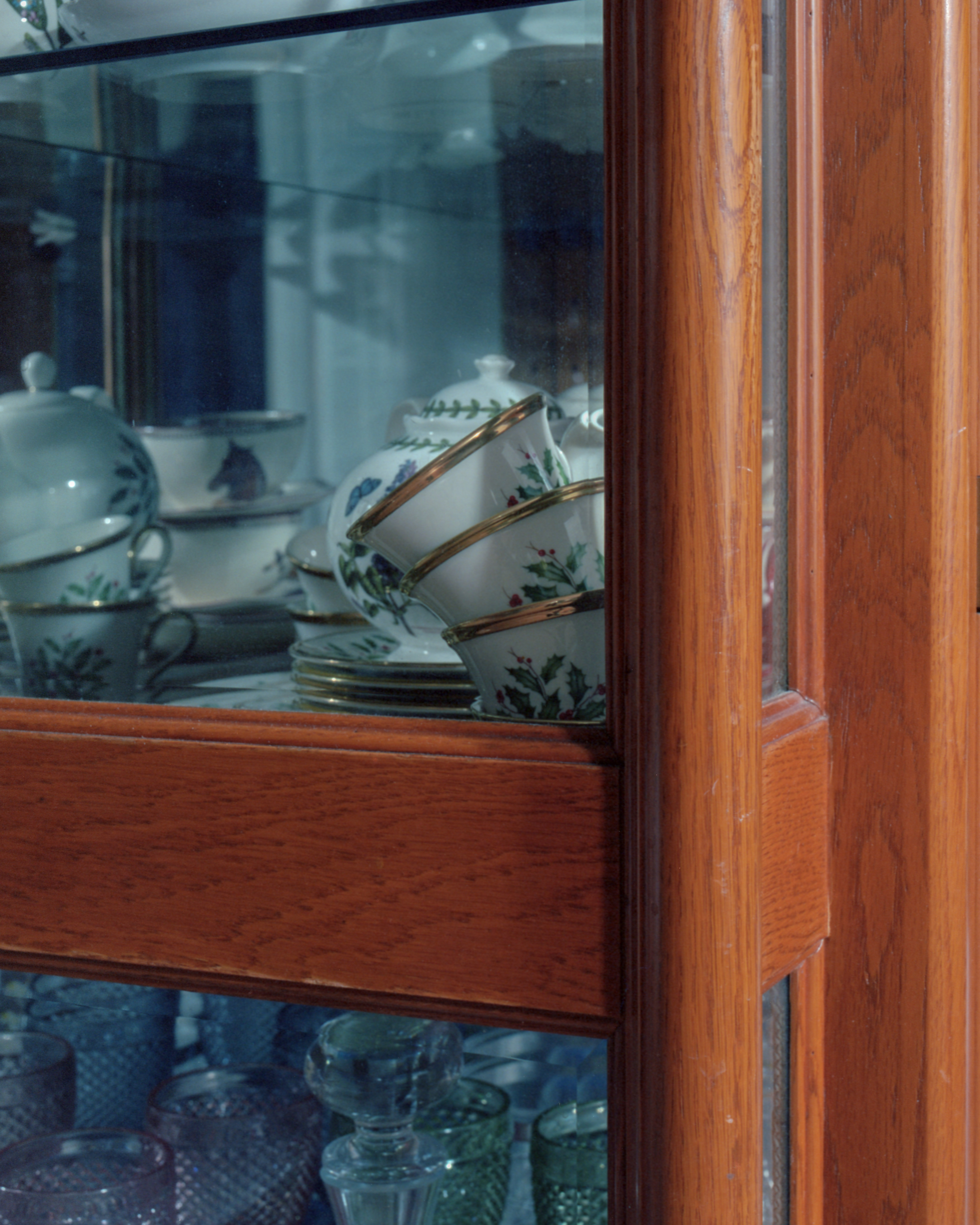
Cups in a cupboard.

== See also ==
- China cabinet
- Curio cabinet
