= Washer-dryer =

Single machine for washing and drying clothes

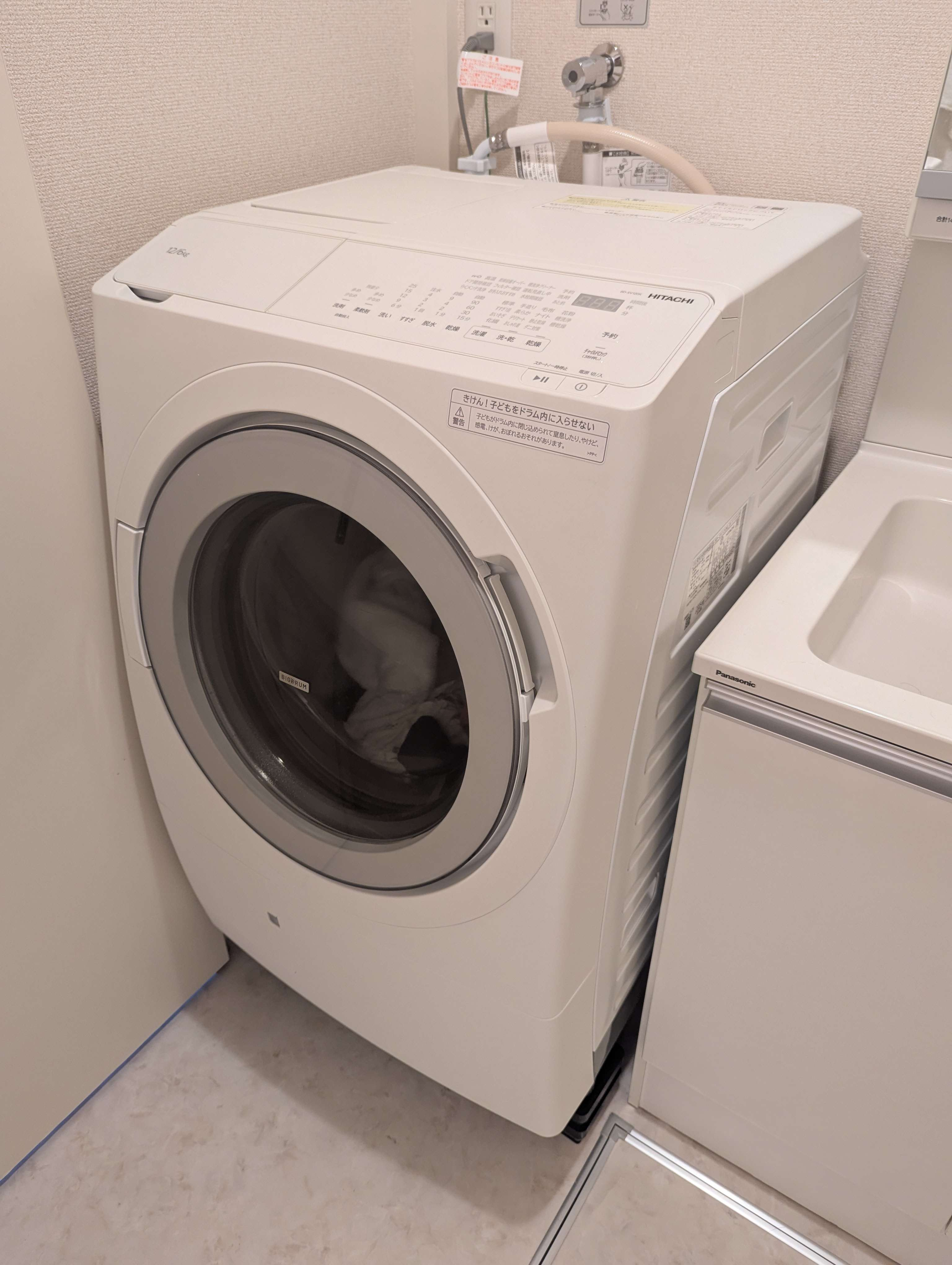
This Hitachi washer-dryer has a complex control panel and display to handle various options (2025).

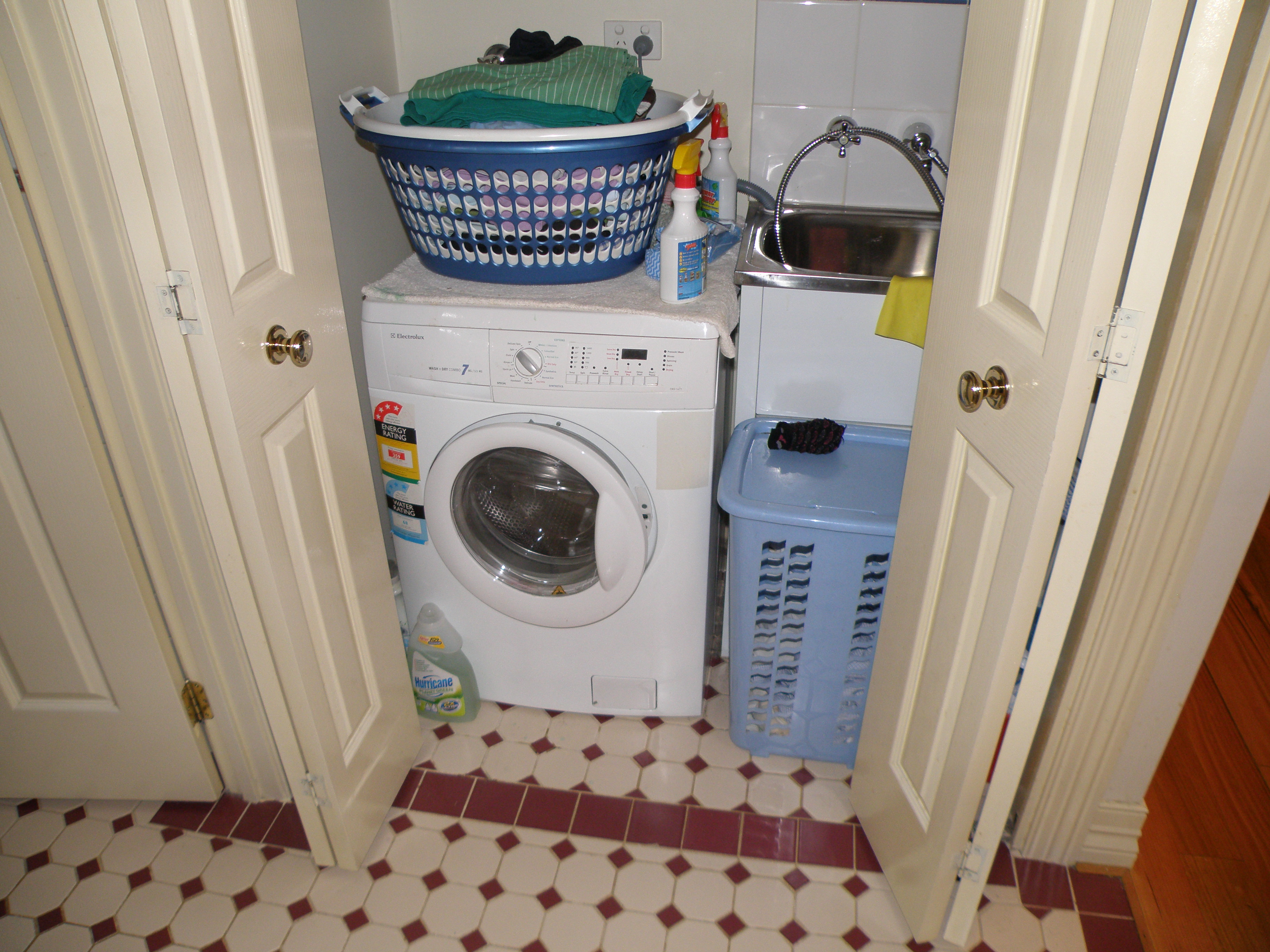
Combo washer dryers typically use a front-loading configuration.

A combi washer dryer (also known as a washer-dryer in the UK) is a combination in a single cabinet of a washing machine and a clothes dryer. It should not be confused with a "stacked" combination of a separate autowasher and a separate tumble dryer.

The small size of these machines, compared to the total space consumed by a separate autowasher and tumble dryer, suits them to small homes, apartments, and condominiums. Combo units typically have a small height, allowing them to fit into confined places. The units are notable for their ability to wash and dry clothes in a single cycle without the need to transfer laundry between two machines.

== History ==
Aside from the early wringer/washer machine of the mid-19th century, washing and drying machines were not combined until the latter half of the 20th century. The first completely automatic clothes washer was developed by Bendix Home Appliances in 1937; the same company also invented the first washer-dryer combination unit in 1953.

== Typical features ==
=== Front-loading design ===
Most washer-dryers are of the front-loading design for easier access, better efficiency, and more effective washes. Instead of just leaving the clothes to soak in the water throughout the entire wash, like a top-loading machine would do, the front-loading design rotates the drum along its longitudinal axis, so that the contents of the drum are repeatedly lifted in and out of the water throughout the wash cycle.

=== Condensation-based ventless drying system ===
Most washer dryer combi's are ventless and are designed with drying systems that work differently from the ordinary stand-alone (vented) dryer. Instead of venting moist hot air to the outside, like a conventional dryer would, the combo unit makes use of condensation similarly to condenser dryers. Hot dry(er) air enters the drum from either the front or the rear, and evaporates some of the moisture from the tumbling clothing. This warm, damp air is then drawn through a condensing chamber, and the extracted water is flushed out the drain hose to the sink or through the plumbing lines. These units can be installed under cabinets, in cupboards or anywhere with electricity.

Typically in separate condenser dryers, cool air is used to cool down the process air from the inside drum and to condense the vapor. In combined washer dryers, however, cold water is used instead. The water flows in the opposite direction to the air, allowing the air to cool and to release its moisture, which is pumped out along with the water used to cool the air. These machines normally take longer than regular dryers, because the combo unit has a smaller drum, so there is less volume to allow air circulation and the drum itself must be dried immediately after a wash cycle. This water-fed drying system consumes water for both the washing and drying phases of operation, and may not be suitable for areas where water is scarce.

Alternative methods of cooling the condenser have emerged.

Since condensing dryers discharge waste heat inside buildings, they may increase air conditioning heat loads in summer or provide useful heat in winter. Energy and water usage must be evaluated for the entire system over the entire year to ensure a valid comparison.

=== Automatic sensors and systems ===
Washer-dryers are normally built with sensors and systems to automate much of the washing and drying cycles. Some of the higher end model washer dryer combi's have sensors that monitor water level, suds levels, temperature levels, and garment dryness. The information gathered by these sensors are used to control the spin RPM, cycle settings, draining systems, and other functions.

== Capacity ==
The amount a combi washer dryer unit can hold varies depending on the type of unit. Most hold a slightly smaller amount compared to full size machines. LG makes both a 2.3 litres (0.51 imp gal; 0.61 US gal) and a 4.3 litres (0.95 imp gal; 1.1 US gal) capacity all-in-one washer dryer. Like the equivalent difference between autowashers and tumble dryers, the washing capacity is greater than the drying capacity on most combi units. Airflow through the drum is a necessary part of clothes drying, so the difference is greater (these units can generally dry only 1/2 to 3/4 of their maximum wash capacity).

== Heat pump combo ==
AEG-Electrolux debuted the first heat pump washer dryer combo unit at IFA Berlin, September 2013 (AEG ÖkoKombi). Commercialization of this product started in April 2014, and it is currently available in the whole of Europe. Main benefits compared to standard washer-dryers are low-temperature drying (and thus, improved fabric care); energy efficiency, since it uses 40% less electricity compared to standard A-class washer dryers (according to EU energy label). AEG Okokombi's are currently produced at the Electrolux Porcia Plant in Italy, where it was designed and industrialized by local R&D, being the only heat pump washer dryer on the European market, while Panasonic and Toshiba offer similar products in Asia since 2005. Cold side of heat pump works as dehumidifier meanwhile hot side works as heater.

== Disadvantages ==
In the past, combi washer dryer capacity was generally smaller than that of full-size autowashers, and it also took much longer to process a load of laundry. Currently, available washer dryers are able to wash 11 kilograms (24 lb) and dry 7 kilograms (15 lb) (nominal rating); they are fully comparable to standard autowashers and tumble dryers. Since washing 11 kilograms (24 lb) of clothes is quite uncommon for ordinary customers, one can wash and dry even large loads with satisfactory performances. Nevertheless, many users say they take out some wet laundry and dry their clothes in two batches to speed drying time.

Another major drawback of old washer dryers was that they took significantly longer to dry a batch of clothes in comparison to stand-alone dryers. Stand-alone dryers make use of hot air or other heating elements to dry the clothes in a fraction of the time that it took the condensation-based drying system in washer dryers. This was a drawback that was inherent to the washer dryer's design since the dryer had to work longer to dry the drum and its enclosure as well as the clothes inside the drum. On an average, clothes that weigh between 1.8–2.3 kilograms (4.0–5.1 lb) would have kept the machine working for no less than 4.5 hours.

Washer-dryers not using a heat pump have also been criticized because they are not as efficient as some of the stand-alone machines. For these machines, longer drying times of washer dryer combi's also make it difficult to increase efficiency because the machine has to stay in operation for much longer than a stand-alone dryer does. On the other hand, in heat pump washer dryers, energy is recovered, and it enables energy saving of about 50%.

Some consumers may find these machines to be impractical. Small capacities, long drying times, poor efficiency ratings (with the exception of heat pump machines), and pricing all are disadvantages of using these combi machines, which must be weighed against their space saving and convenient hookup advantages.

== See also ==
- Energy Star – US EPA program and certification
