= Shoe dryer =

Machine that dries shoes

A shoe dryer or boot dryer is a machine used for drying shoes, and usually functions by blowing air on the inside of the shoes. The airflow causes the shoes to dry faster. The air can be heated for even faster drying, and these are the most common types. Shoe dryers can be especially useful for people who frequently have wet shoes, such as families with small children or for those who often hike outdoors, or for ski boots which are typically moist after use. Many shoes dryers have a timer which shuts off the dryer after awhile. There are also shoe dryers which instead use a heated grate that the shoes are placed on top of, and also do not blow air.

== Noise ==
Many fan-driven shoe dryers emit bothersome noise during use. In a test from 2019, the most silent model was measured at 45 decibel (dB), while the other models were measured at 50 and 57 dB. In 2022, another model was measured at 56 dB in "tornado" mode and 29 dB in "whisper" mode, and in 2023, a different variant of the same dryer was measured at 72 dB. It was also stated that the higher pitch of those models noise could contribute to it being perceived as more intense and bothersome.

== Air flow ==
The volumetric flow rate, i.e. the amount of air that is moved, is an important measure of fan-based shoe dryers. For example, a model tested in 2023 was said to have a volume flow of 12 cubic meters per hour (m³/h), which corresponds to 12 000 liters per hour or just over 3 liters of air per second.

== Heated air ==
Shoe dryers with a fan often emit slightly tepid or warm air. In a test from 2019, one of the models was rated at a power of 350 watt, of which 30 W was utilized as fan power and the remaining around 320 W were used for heating. Another model in the test had two temperature settings for choosing between 40 °C and 55 °C air temperature. A model tested in 2023 had settings for blowing air at room temperature, or heated air at 37, 45 or 60 degrees Celsius.

Not all shoes can withstand heated drying. Using high heat can put wear on shoes made of certain materials. For example, the use of a tumble dryer, heating cables or heating cabinet can lead to leather shoes cracking.

== Fire hazard ==
Shoe dryers with heating can be a fire hazard if left on for too long, as with any heating appliance, and should therefore be used under supervision.

== See also ==
- Dehumidifier
- Drying cabinet
- Drying room
