= Home appliance =

Machine for household uses

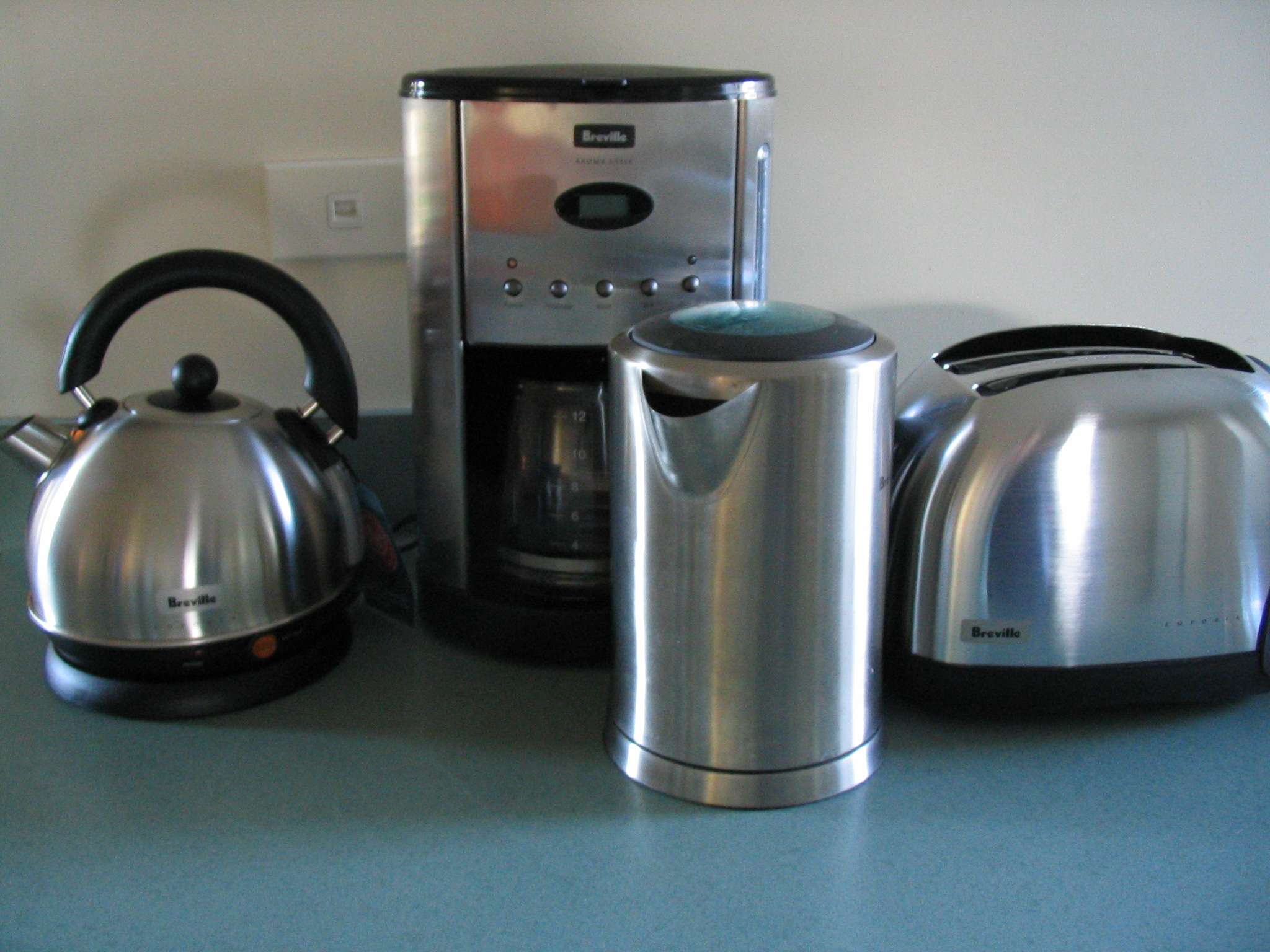
- Home appliances may be used in kitchens.
- Industry: Food and beverages, health care
- Application: Kitchens and laundry rooms
- Wheels: In some cases
- Examples: Refrigerator, toaster, kettle, microwave oven, blender

A home appliance, also referred to as a domestic appliance, an electric appliance or a household appliance, is a machine which assists in household functions such as cooking, cleaning and food preservation.

The domestic application attached to home appliance is tied to the definition of appliance as "an instrument or device designed for a particular use or function". Collins English Dictionary defines "home appliance" as: "devices or machines, usually electrical, that are in your home and which you use to do jobs such as cleaning or cooking". The broad usage allows for nearly any device intended for domestic use to be a home appliance, including consumer electronics as well as stoves, refrigerators, toasters and air conditioners.

The development of self-contained electric and gas-powered appliances, an American innovation, emerged in the early 20th century. This evolution is linked to the decline of full-time domestic servants and desire to reduce household chores, allowing for more leisure time. Early appliances included washing machines, water heaters, refrigerators, and sewing machines. The industry saw significant growth post-World War II, with the introduction of dishwashers and clothes dryers. By the 1980s, the appliance industry was booming, leading to mergers and antitrust legislation. The US National Appliance Energy Conservation Act of 1987 mandated a 25% reduction in energy consumption every five years. By the 1990s, five companies dominated over 90% of the market.

Major appliances, often called white goods, include items like refrigerators and washing machines, while small appliances encompass items such as toasters and coffee makers. Product design shifted in the 1960s, embracing new materials and colors. Consumer electronics, often referred to as brown goods, include items like TVs and computers. There is a growing trend towards home automation and internet-connected appliances. Recycling of home appliances involves dismantling and recovering materials.

== History ==
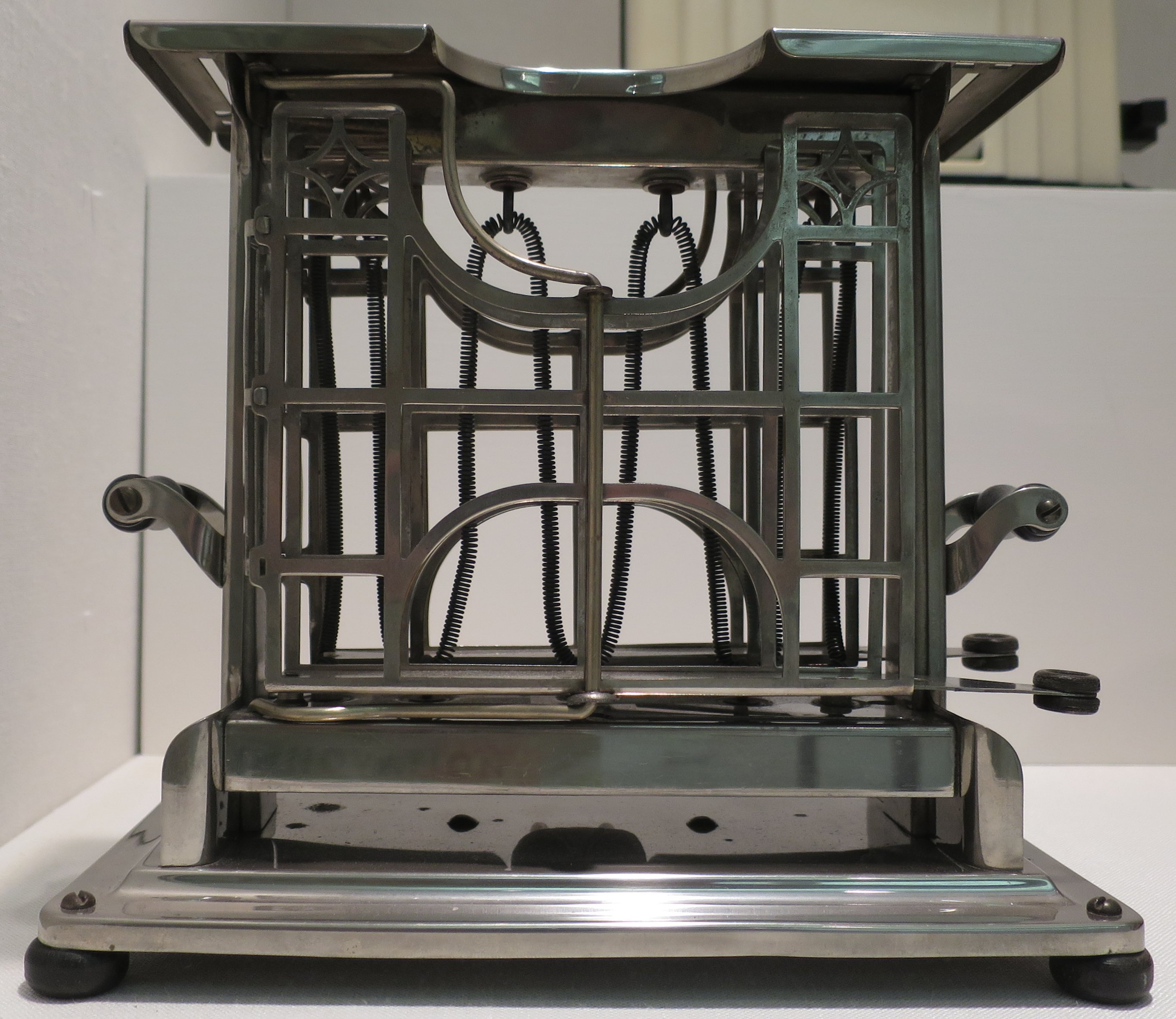
Early 20th century electric toaster

While many appliances have existed for centuries, the self-contained electric or gas powered appliances are a uniquely American innovation that emerged in the early twentieth century. The development of these appliances is tied to the disappearance of full-time domestic servants and the desire to reduce the time-consuming activities in pursuit of more recreational time. In the early 1900s, electric and gas appliances included washing machines, water heaters, refrigerators, kettles and sewing machines. The invention of Earl Richardson's small electric clothes iron in 1903 gave a small initial boost to the home appliance industry. In the Post–World War II economic expansion, the domestic use of dishwashers, and clothes dryers were part of a shift for convenience. Increasing discretionary income was reflected by a rise in miscellaneous home appliances.

In America during the 1980s, the industry shipped $1.5 billion worth of goods each year and employed over 14,000 workers, with revenues doubling between 1982 and 1990 to $3.3 billion. Throughout this period, companies merged and acquired one another to reduce research and production costs and eliminate competitors, resulting in antitrust legislation.

The United States Department of Energy reviews compliance with the National Appliance Energy Conservation Act of 1987, which required manufacturers to reduce the energy consumption of the appliances by 25% every five years.

In the 1990s, the appliance industry was very consolidated, with over 90% of the products being sold by just five companies. For example, in 1991, dishwasher manufacturing market share was split between General Electric with 40% market share, Whirlpool with 31%, Electrolux with 20%, Maytag with 7% and Thermador with just 2%.

== Major appliances ==
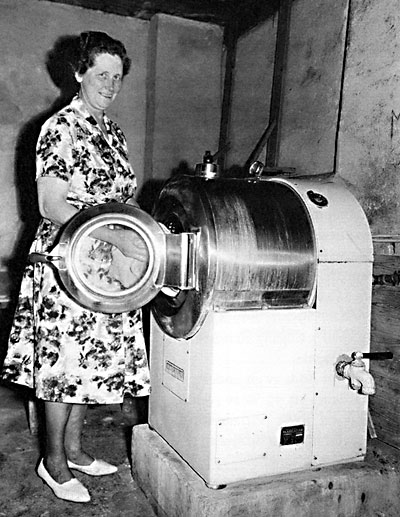
Swedish washing machine, 1950s

Major appliances, also known as white goods, comprise major household appliances and may include: air conditioners, dishwashers, clothes dryers, drying cabinets, freezers, refrigerators, kitchen stoves, water heaters, washing machines, trash compactors, microwave ovens, and induction cookers. White goods were typically painted or enameled white, and many of them still are.

== Small appliances ==
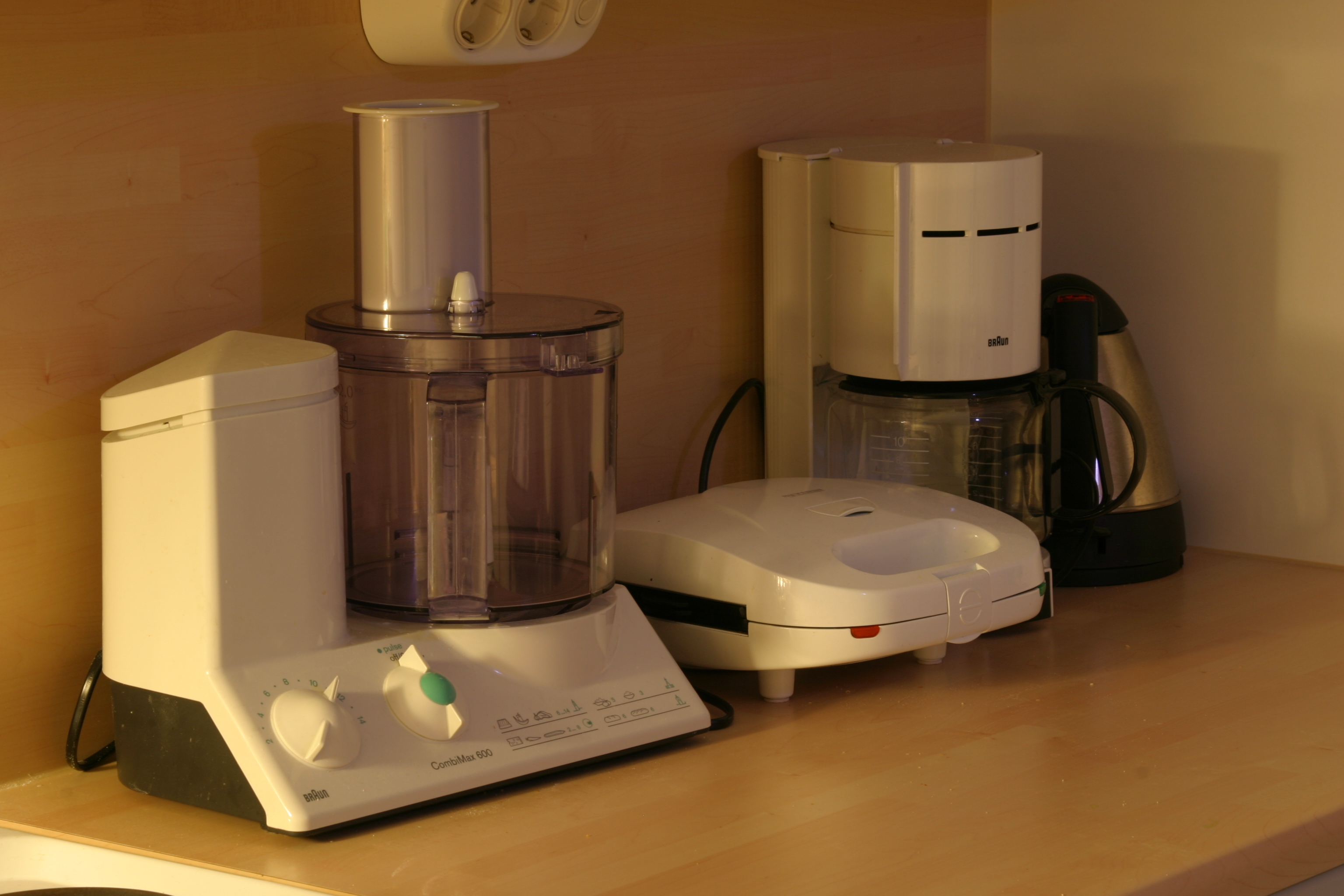
Small kitchen appliances

The small appliance department at a store

Small appliances are typically small household electrical machines, also very useful and easily carried and installed. Yet another category is used in the kitchen, including: juicers, electric mixers, meat grinders, coffee grinders, deep fryers, herb grinders, food processors, electric kettles, waffle irons, coffee makers, blenders, rice cookers, toasters and exhaust hoods.

== Product design ==
In the 1960s the product design for appliances such as washing machines, refrigerators, and electric toasters shifted away from Streamline Moderne and embraced technological advances in the fabrication of sheet metal. A choice in color, as well as fashionable accessory, could be offered to the mass market without increasing production cost. Home appliances were sold as space-saving ensembles.

== Consumer electronics ==
Consumer electronics (or home electronics) are electronic (analog or digital) equipment intended for everyday use, typically in private homes. Consumer electronics include devices used for entertainment, communications and recreation. In British English, they are often called "brown goods" by producers and sellers, to distinguish them from "white goods" which are meant for housekeeping tasks, such as washing machines and refrigerators, although nowadays, these could be considered brown goods, some of these being connected to the Internet. (Note: "Brown" from the bakelite and wood-veneer finishes typical on 1950s and 1960s radio and TV receivers, and in contrast to "white goods".) Some such appliances were traditionally finished with genuine or imitation wood, hence the name. This has become rare but the name has stuck, even for goods that are unlikely ever to have had a wooden case (e.g. camcorders). In the 2010s, this distinction is absent in large big box consumer electronics stores, which sell both entertainment, communication, and home office devices and kitchen appliances such as refrigerators. The highest selling consumer electronics products are compact discs. Examples are: home electronics, radio receivers, TV sets, VCRs, CD and DVD players, digital cameras, camcorders, still cameras, clocks, alarm clocks, computers, video game consoles, HiFi and home cinema, telephones and answering machines.

== Life spans ==
A survey conducted in 2020 of more than thirteen thousand people in the UK revealed how long appliance owners had their appliances before needing to replace them due to a fault, deteriorating performance, or the age of the appliance.

Appliance	Longest average estimated lifespan	Shortest average estimated lifespan
Washing machine	21 years	13 years
Tumble dryer	24 years	17 years
Dishwasher	22 years	13 years
Built-in oven	29 years	23 years
Fridge freezer	24 years	14 years
Fridge	29 years	18 years

== Home automation ==
There is a trend of networking home appliances together, and combining their controls and key functions. For instance, energy distribution could be managed more evenly so that when a washing machine is on, an oven can go into a delayed start mode, or vice versa. Or, a washing machine and clothes dryer could share information about load characteristics (gentle/normal, light/full), and synchronize their finish times so the wet laundry does not have to wait before being put in the dryer.

Additionally, some manufacturers of home appliances are quickly beginning to place hardware that enables internet connectivity in home appliances to allow for remote control, automation, communication with other home appliances, and more functionality enabling connected cooking. Internet-connected home appliances were especially prevalent during recent Consumer Electronics Show events.

== Recycling ==
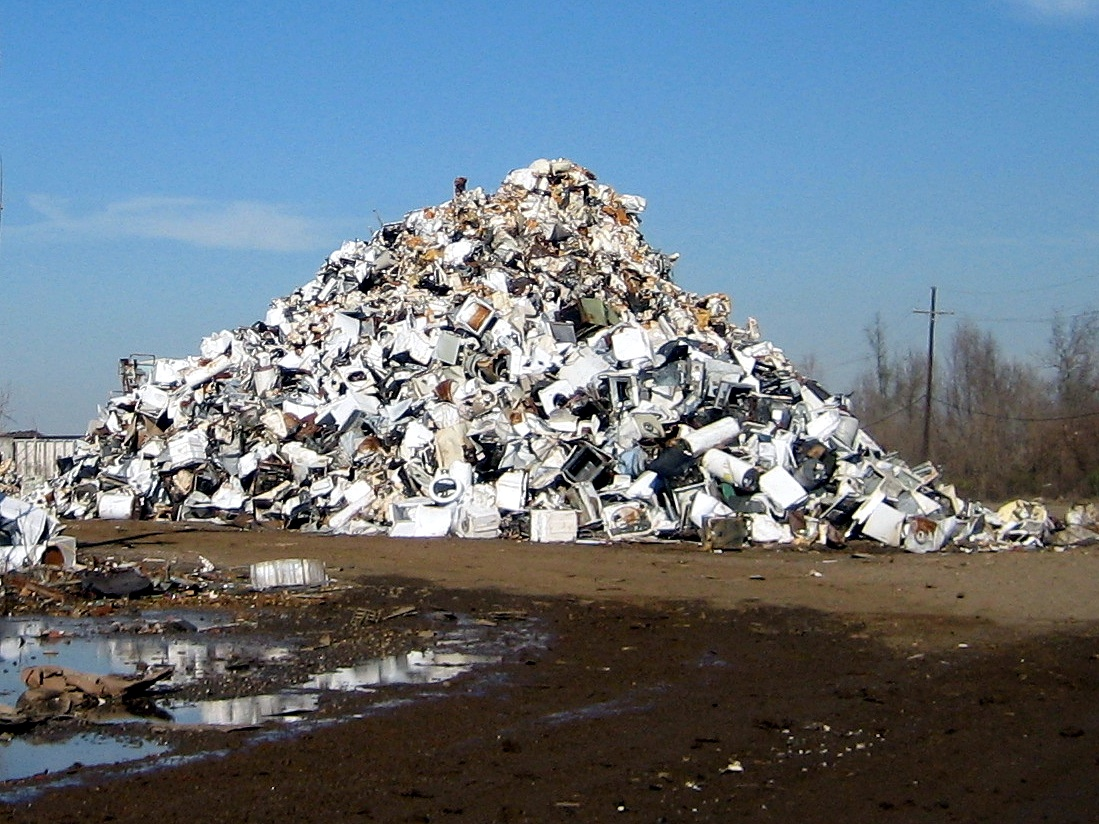
New Orleans, Louisiana, United States after Hurricane Katrina: mounds of trashed appliances with a few smashed automobiles mixed in, waiting to be scrapped

Appliance recycling consists of dismantling waste home appliances and scrapping their parts for reuse. The main types of appliances that are recycled are T.V.s, refrigerators, air conditioners, washing machines, and computers. It involves disassembly, removal of hazardous components and destruction of the equipment to recover materials, generally by shredding, sorting and grading.

== See also ==
- Domestic technology – Usage of applied science in houses
- Home automation – Building automation for a home
