= Laundry room =

Room where clothes are washed

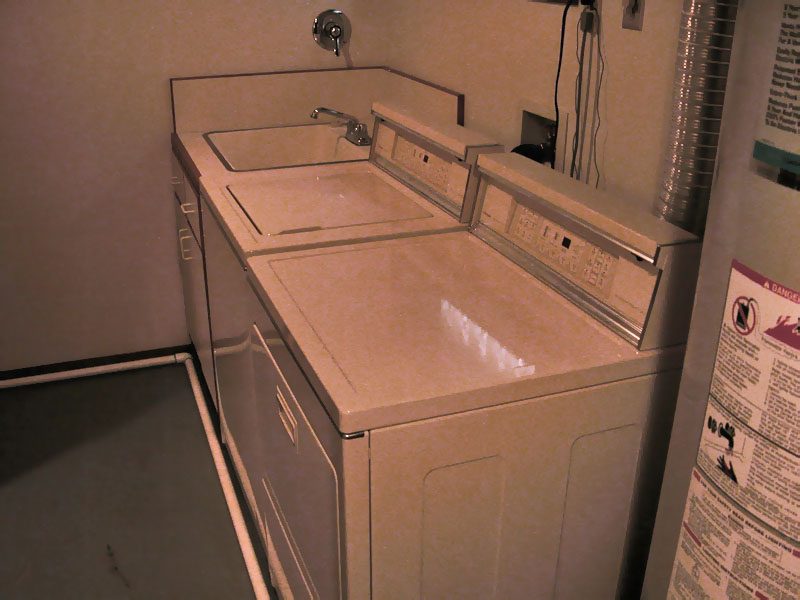
Washing machines in a laundry room

Some laundry rooms are built together with other utilities such as sinks

A laundry room, also known as a utility room, is a room where clothes are washed, and sometimes also dried. In a modern home, laundry rooms are often equipped with an automatic washing machine and clothes dryer, and often a large basin, called a laundry tub or trough, for hand-washing of delicate clothing articles such as sweaters, as well as an ironing board. Laundry rooms may also include storage cabinets, countertops for folding clothes, and, space permitting, a small sewing machine.

The term utility room is more commonly used in British English, while Australian English and North American English generally refer to this room as a laundry, except in the American Southeast. "Utility" refers to an item which is designed for usefulness or practical use, so in turn most of the items kept in this room have functional attributes, i.e. "form follows function".

== History ==
The utility room was a modern spin off to the scullery room where important kitchen items were kept during its usage in England, the term was further defined around the 14th century as a household department where kitchen items are taken care of. The term utility room was mentioned in 1760, when a cottage was built in a rural location in the United Kingdom that was accessible through Penarth and Cardiff. A utility room for general purposes also depicted its use as a guest room in case of an immediate need. A 1944 Scottish housing and planning report recommended new state-built homes for families could provide a utility room as a general purpose workroom for the home (for washing clothes, cleaning boots and jobbing repairs). An American publication called the Pittsburgh Post-Gazette reported on July 24, 1949 that utility rooms had become more popular than basements in new constructions. On June 28, 1959, in a report of a typical American house being built in Moscow, Russia, the house was described to have a utility room immediately at the right side after the entrance. The Chicago Tribune reported that the laundry room was then commonly being referred to as the utility room in a publication on September 30, 1970.

== Uses ==
The utility room has several uses but typically functions as an area to do laundry. This room contains laundry equipment such as a washing machine, tumble dryer, ironing boards and clothes iron. The room is also used for closet organization and storage. The room would normally contain a second coat closet which is used to store seasonal clothing such as winter coats or clothing which are no longer used daily. Storage spaces would contain other appliances which would generally be in the kitchen if it was in usage daily. Furnaces and the water heater are sometimes incorporated to the room as well. Shelving and trash may sometimes be seen at this area as not to congest the other parts of the house.

== Location ==
In older homes, the laundry is typically located in the basement, but in many modern homes, the laundry room might be found on the main floor near the kitchen or, less often, upstairs near the bedrooms.

Another typical location is adjacent to the garage and the laundry room serves as a mudroom for the entrance from the garage. As the garage is often at a different elevation (or grade) from the rest of the house, the laundry room serves as an entrance from the garage that may be sunken from the rest of the house. This prevents or reduces the need for stairs between the garage and the house.

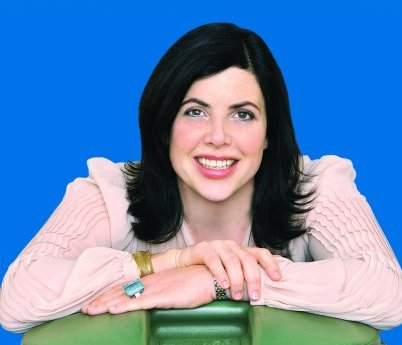
Kirstie Allsopp advocates utility rooms in the UK to some controversy

Most houses in the United Kingdom do not have laundry rooms; as such, the washing machine and dryer (if possessed) are usually located in the kitchen or garage.

In Hungary, some older apartment buildings and most workers' hostels have communal laundry rooms, called mosókonyha (lit. "washing kitchen") in Hungarian. In the former, when residents started to all own individual washing machines in their apartments, obsoleted laundry rooms were sometimes converted into small apartments, shops or workshops (e.g. a shoemaker's) or used simply for storage.

In Sweden, laundry rooms, called a "tvättstuga", are found in almost all older apartment buildings. Swedish laundry rooms are often located in the basements of the buildings, but can also be found in detached buildings. In the 1980s, analogue booking boards with locking cylinders were introduced to regulate washing times and create a booking system. Some of these have been replaced in the 2000s by electronic counterparts with electronic keys or tokens.

== See also ==
- Drying room
- Furnace room
- Lavoir, a public place for the washing of clothes
- Mechanical room
- Root cellar
- Scullery, a room used for washing up dishes and laundering clothes, or as an overflow kitchen
- Storage room
- Technical room
