= Clothes dryer =

Appliance used for drying wet clothes

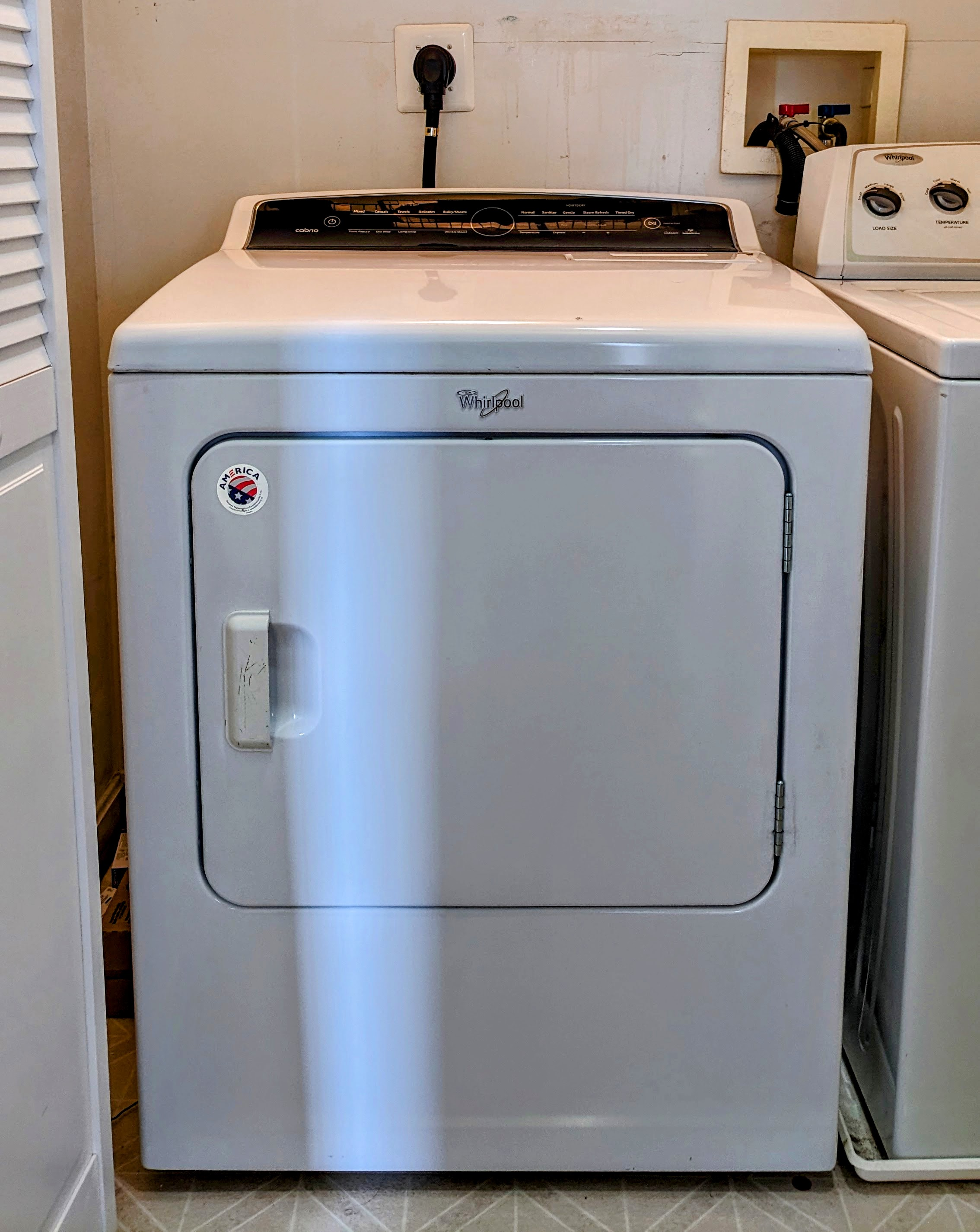
An American style clothes dryer with a rear control panel.

A European style clothes dryer with a front control panel.

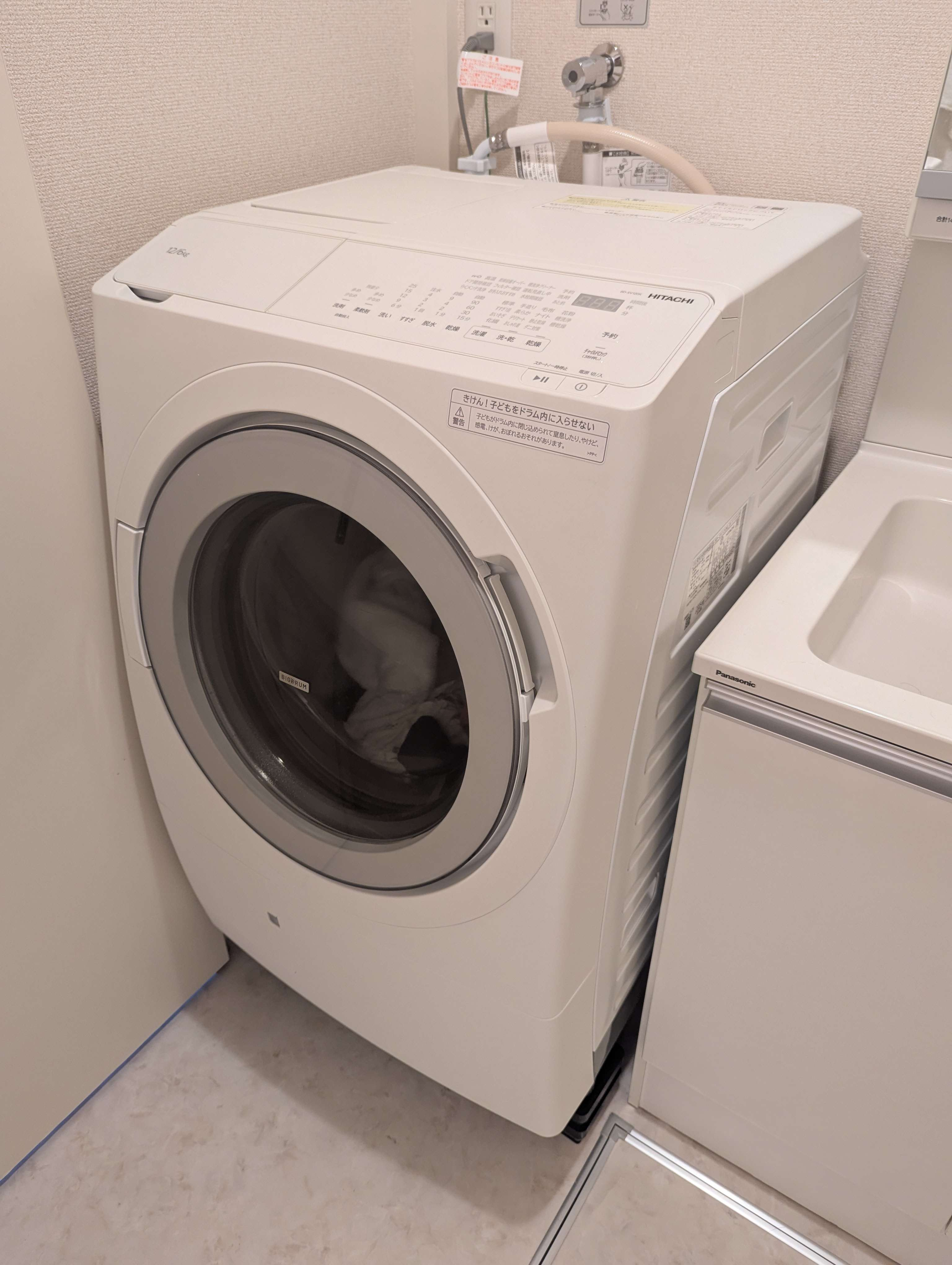
A Japanese style combination washer-dryer.

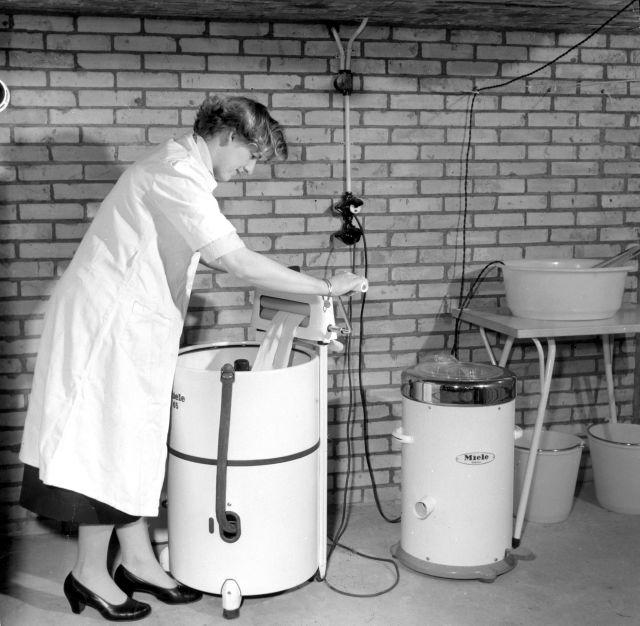
A German spin dryer in use.

A clothes dryer (tumble dryer, drying machine, drying device, or simply dryer) is a powered household appliance that is used to remove moisture from a load of clothing, bedding and other textiles, usually after they are washed in the washing machine.

Many dryers consist of a rotating drum called a "tumbler" through which heated air is circulated to evaporate moisture while the tumbler is rotated to maintain air space between the articles. Using such a machine may cause clothes to shrink or become less soft (by loss of short soft fibers). A simpler non-rotating machine called a "drying cabinet" may be used for delicate fabrics and other items not suitable for a tumble dryer. Other machines include steam to de-shrink clothes and eliminate the need for ironing.

== Tumble dryers ==
Tumble dryers continuously draw in air from their surroundings and heat it before passing it through the tumbler. The resulting hot, humid air is usually vented outside to make room for more air to continue the drying process. The air can be heated using a gas flame, in which case the humid air contains combustion products such as CO2, or it can be heated electrically using nichrome wire or semiconductor devices such as PTC (Positive Temperature Coefficient) heaters.

Tumble dryers are sometimes integrated with a washing machine, in the form of washer-dryer combination units, which are essentially a front-loading washing machine with an integrated dryer or (in the US) a laundry center, which stacks the dryer on top of the washer and integrates the controls for both machines into a single control panel. Often the washer and dryer functions will have a different capacity, with the dryer usually having a lower capacity than the washer. Tumble dryers can also be top loading, with the drum loaded from the top of the machine and the drum's end supports in the left and right sides, instead of the more conventional front and rear. They can be as narrow as 40 centimetres (16 in) in width, and may include detachable stationary racks for drying items like plush toys and footwear.

== Ventless dryers ==
=== Spin dryers ===
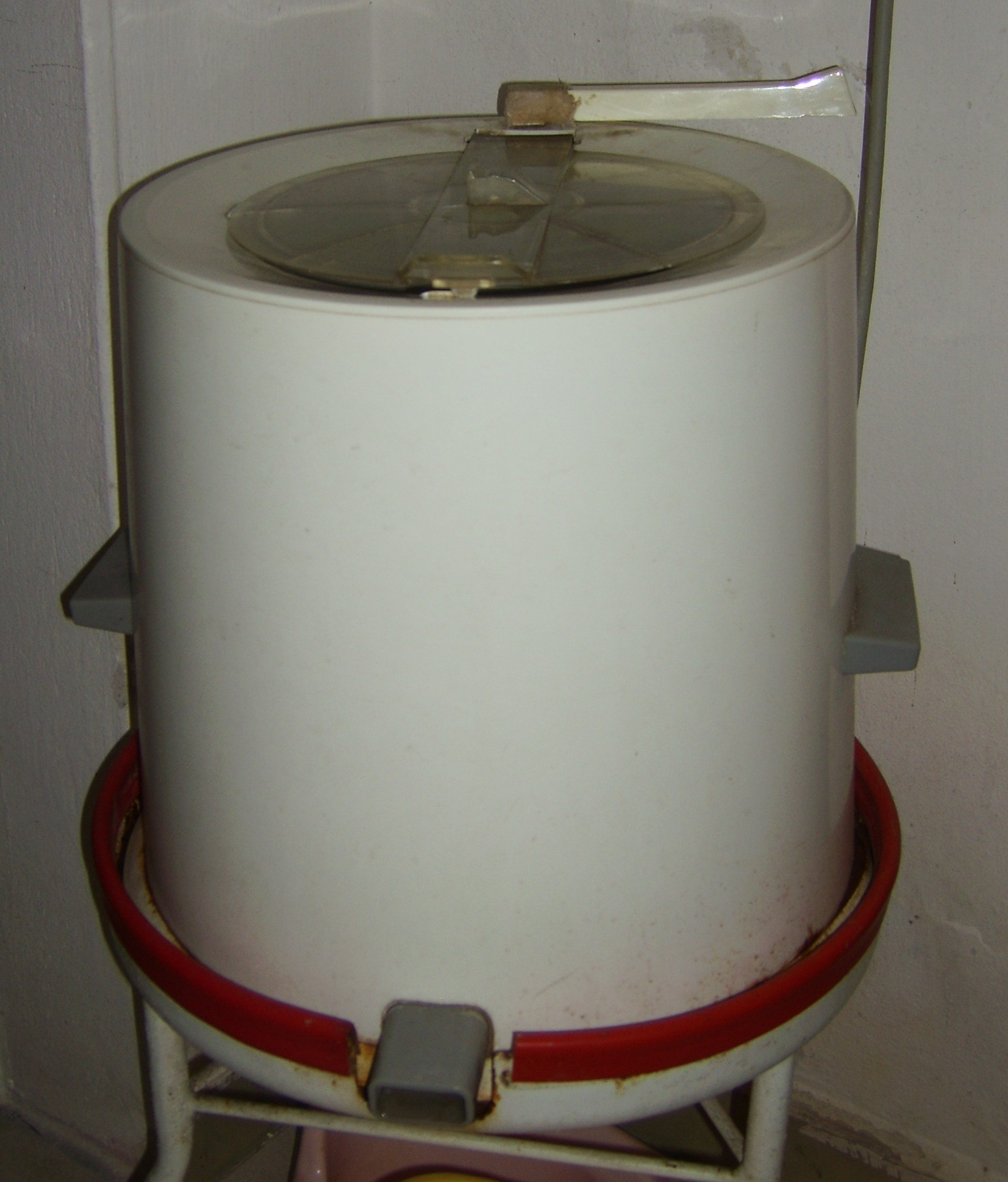
Spin dryer type TS66.

These centrifuge machines simply spin their drums much faster than a typical washer could, in order to extract additional water from the load. They may remove more water in two minutes than a heated tumble dryer can in twenty, thus saving significant amounts of time and energy. Although spinning alone will not completely dry clothing, this additional step saves a worthwhile amount of time and energy for large laundry operations such as those of hospitals.

=== Condenser dryers ===
Just as in a tumble dryer, condenser or condensation dryers pass heated air through the load. However, instead of exhausting this air, the dryer uses a heat exchanger to cool the air and condense the water vapor into either a drain pipe or a collection tank. The drier air is run through the loop again. The heat exchanger typically uses ambient air as its coolant, therefore the heat produced by the dryer will go into the immediate surroundings instead of the outside, increasing the room temperature. In some designs, cold water is used in the heat exchanger, eliminating this heating, but requiring increased water usage.

In terms of energy use, condenser dryers typically require around 2 kilowatt hours (kW⋅h) of energy per average load.

Because the heat exchange process simply cools the internal air using ambient air (or cold water in some cases), it will not dry the air in the internal loop to as low a level of humidity as typical fresh, ambient air. As a consequence of the increased humidity of the air used to dry the load, this type of dryer requires somewhat more time than a tumble dryer. Condenser dryers are a particularly attractive option where long, intricate ducting would be required to vent the dryer.

=== Heat pump dryers ===
A closed-cycle heat pump clothes dryer uses a heat pump to dehumidify the processing air. Such dryers typically use under half the energy per load of a condenser dryer.

Whereas condensation dryers use a passive heat exchanger cooled by ambient air, these dryers use a heat pump. The hot, humid air from the tumbler is passed through a heat pump where the cold side condenses the water vapor into either a drain pipe or a collection tank and the hot side reheats the air afterward for re-use. In this way not only does the dryer avoid the need for ducting, but it also conserves much of its heat within the dryer instead of exhausting it into the surroundings. Heat pump dryers can, therefore, use up to 50% less energy required by either condensation or conventional electric dryers. Heat pump dryers use about 1 kW⋅h of energy to dry an average load instead of 2 kW⋅h for a condenser dryer, or from 3 to 9 kW⋅h, for a conventional electric dryer. Domestic heat pump dryers are designed to work in typical ambient temperatures from 5 to 30 °C (41 to 86 °F). Below 5 °C (41 °F), drying times significantly increase.

As with condensation dryers, the heat exchanger will not dry the internal air to as low a level of humidity as the typical ambient air. With respect to ambient air, the higher humidity of the air used to dry the clothes has the effect of increasing drying times; however, because heat pump dryers conserve much of the heat of the air they use, the already-hot air can be cycled more quickly, possibly leading to shorter drying times than tumble dryers, depending on the model.

=== Mechanical steam compression dryers ===
A new type of dryer in development, these machines are a more advanced version of heat pump dryers. Instead of using hot air to dry the clothing, mechanical steam compression dryers use water recovered from the clothing in the form of steam. First, the tumbler and its contents are heated to 100 °C (212 °F). The wet steam that results purges the system of air and is the only remaining atmosphere in the tumbler.

As wet steam exits the tumbler, it is mechanically compressed (hence the name) to extract water vapor and transfer the heat of vaporization to the remaining gaseous steam. This pressurized, gaseous steam is then allowed to expand, and is superheated before being injected back into the tumbler where its heat causes more water to vaporize from the clothing, creating more wet steam and restarting the cycle.

Like heat pump dryers, mechanical steam compression dryers recycle much of the heat used to dry the clothes, and they operate in a very similar range of efficiency as heat pump dryers. Both types can be over twice as efficient as conventional tumble dryers. The considerably higher temperatures used in mechanical steam compression dryers result in drying times on the order of half as long as those of heat pump dryers.

=== Convectant drying ===
Marketed by some manufacturers as a "static clothes drying technique", convectant dryers simply consist of a heating unit at the bottom, a vertical chamber, and a vent at top. The unit heats air at the bottom, reducing its relative humidity, and the natural tendency of hot air to rise brings this low-humidity air into contact with the clothes. This design is slower than conventional tumble dryers, but relatively energy-efficient if well-implemented. It works particularly well in cold and humid environments, where it dries clothes substantially faster than line-drying. In hot and dry weather, the performance delta over line-drying is negligible.

Given that this is a relatively simple and cheap technique to materialize, most consumer products showcase the added benefit of portability and/or modularity. Newer designs implement a fan heater at the bottom to pump hot air into the vertical drying rack chamber. Temperatures in excess of 60 °C (140 °F) can be reached inside these "hot air balloons," yet lint, static cling, and shrinkage are minimal. Upfront cost is significantly lower than tumble, condenser and heat pump designs.

If used in combination with washing machines featuring fast spin cycles (800+ rpm) or spin dryers, the cost-effectiveness of this technique has the potential to render tumble dryer-like designs obsolete in single-person and small family households. One disadvantage is that the moisture from the clothes is released into the immediate surroundings. Proper ventilation or a complementary dehumidifier is recommended for indoor use. It also cannot compete with the tumble dryer's capacity to dry multiple loads of wet clothing in a single day.

=== Solar clothes dryer ===
The solar dryer is a box-shaped stationary construction which encloses a second compartment where the clothes are held. It uses the sun's heat without direct sunlight reaching the clothes. Alternatively, a solar heating box may be used to heat air that is driven through a conventional tumbler dryer.

=== Microwave dryers ===
Japanese manufacturers have developed highly efficient clothes dryers that use microwave radiation to dry the clothes (though a vast majority of Japanese air dry their laundry). Most of the drying is done using microwaves to evaporate the water, but the final drying is done by convection heating, to avoid problems of arcing with metal pieces in the laundry. There are a number of advantages: shorter drying times (25% less), energy savings (17–25% less), and lower drying temperatures. Some analysts think that the arcing and fabric damage is a factor preventing microwave dryers from being developed for the US market.

=== Ultrasonic dryers ===
Ultrasonic dryers use high-frequency signals to drive piezoelectric actuators in order to mechanically shake the clothes, releasing water in the form of a mist which is then removed from the drum. They have the potential to significantly cut energy consumption while needing only one-third of the time needed by a conventional electric dryer for a given load. They also do not have the same issues related with lint in most other types of dryers.

=== Hybrid dryers ===
Some manufacturers, like LG Electronics and Whirlpool, have introduced hybrid dryers, that offer the user the option of using either a heat pump or a traditional electric heating element for drying the user's clothes. Hybrid dryers can also use a heat pump and a heating element at the same time to dry clothes faster.

=== Bathroom clothes-drying ===
This type of dryer, commonly found in Japan, is installed in the bathroom. A unit combining a blower and an exhaust fan is built into the ceiling; it blows warm air onto damp clothes while simultaneously extracting excess moisture from the room.

Its power consumption is lower than that of a tumble dryer. Additionally, since the warm air isn’t extremely hot, it causes minimal damage to clothing.

In Japan, bathrooms and toilets are often located in separate rooms. As a result, even in larger homes, bathrooms tend to be compact. This allows the unit to circulate warm air throughout the entire bathroom and dry clothes effectively, even with its low power consumption.

== Static electricity ==
Clothes dryers can cause static cling through the triboelectric effect. This can be a minor nuisance and is often a symptom of over-drying textiles to below their equilibrium moisture level, particularly when using synthetic materials. Fabric conditioning products such as dryer sheets are marketed to dissipate this static charge, depositing surfactants onto the fabric load by mechanical abrasion during tumbling. Modern dryers often have improved temperature and humidity sensors and electronic controls which aim to stop the drying cycle once textiles are sufficiently dry, avoiding over-drying and the static charge and energy wastage this causes.

== Pest control use ==
Drying at a minimum of 60 °C (140 °F) heat for thirty minutes kills many parasites including house dust mites, bed bugs, and scabies mites and their eggs; a bit more than ten minutes kills ticks. Simply washing drowns dust mites, and exposure to direct sunlight for three hours kills their eggs.

== Lint build-up (tumble dryers) ==
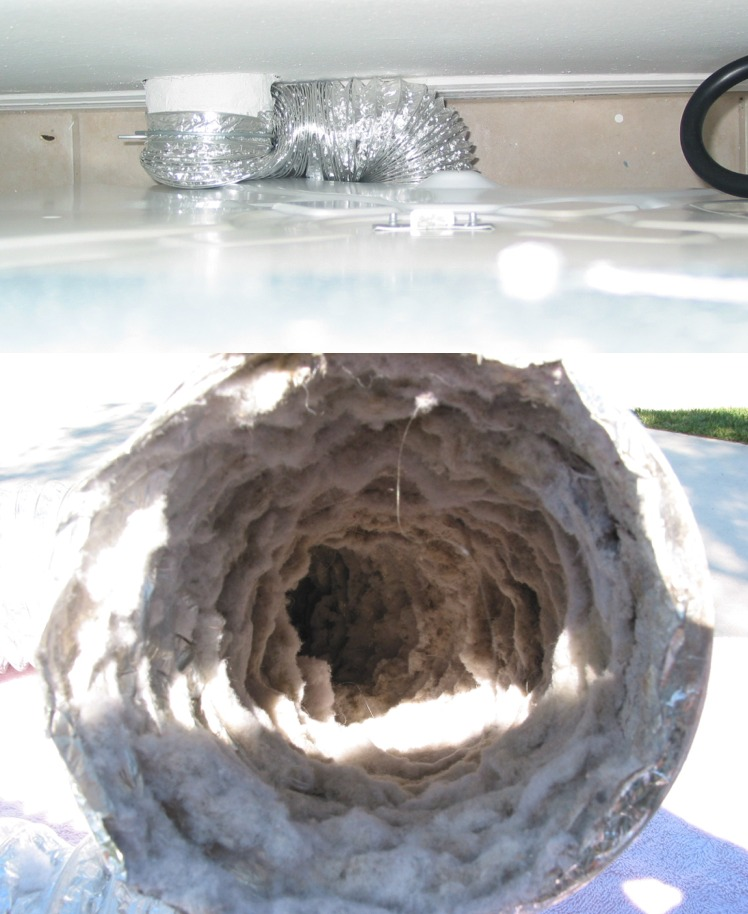
Upper image shows a severely kinked and blocked dryer transition hose used to vent a tumble dryer. In this case, the dryer was located or pushed back too far against the wall. The lower image shows initial lint build-up in the flex transition hose.

Moisture and lint are byproducts of the tumble drying process and are pulled from the drum by a fan motor and then pushed through the remaining exhaust conduit to the exterior termination fitting. Typical exhaust conduit comprises flex transition hose found immediately behind the dryer, the 4-inch (100 mm) rigid galvanized pipe and elbow fittings found within the wall framing, and the vent duct hood found outside the house.

A clean, unobstructed dryer vent improves both the efficiency and safety of the dryer. As the dryer duct pipe becomes partially obstructed and filled with lint, drying time markedly increases and causes the dryer to waste energy. A blocked vent increases the internal temperature and may result in a fire. Clothes dryers are one of the more costly home appliances to operate.

Several factors can contribute to or accelerate rapid lint build-up. These include long or restrictive ducts, bird or rodent nests in the termination, crushed or kinked flex transition hose, terminations with screen-like features, and condensation within the duct due to un-insulated ducts traveling through cold spaces such as a crawl space or attic. If plastic flaps are at the outside end of the duct, one may be able to flex, bend, and temporarily remove the plastic flaps, clean the inside surface of the flaps, clean the last foot or so of the duct, and reattach the plastic flaps. The plastic flaps keep insects, birds, and snakes out of the dryer vent pipe. During cold weather, the warm wet air condenses on the plastic flaps, and minor trace amounts of lint sticks to the wet inside part of the plastic flaps at the outside of the building.

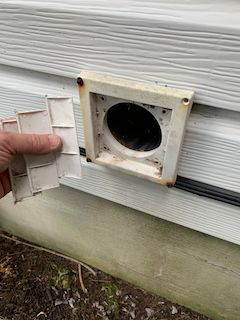
Home clothes dryer outside vent outlet. Flaps on the duct can be removed for cleaning of the flaps and the duct.

Ventless dryers include multi-stage lint filtration systems and some even include automatic evaporator and condenser cleaning functions that can run even while the dryer is running. The evaporator and condenser are usually cleaned with running water. These systems are necessary, in order to prevent lint from building up inside the dryer and evaporator and condenser coils.

Aftermarket add-on lint and moisture traps can be attached to the dryer duct pipe, on machines originally manufactured as outside-venting, to facilitate installation where an outside vent is not available. Increased humidity at the location of installation is a drawback to this method.

== Safety ==
Dryers expose flammable materials to heat. Underwriters Laboratories recommends cleaning the lint filter after every cycle for safety and energy efficiency, provision of adequate ventilation, and cleaning of the duct at regular intervals. UL also recommends that dryers not be used for glass fiber, rubber, foam or plastic items, or any item that has had a flammable substance spilled on it.

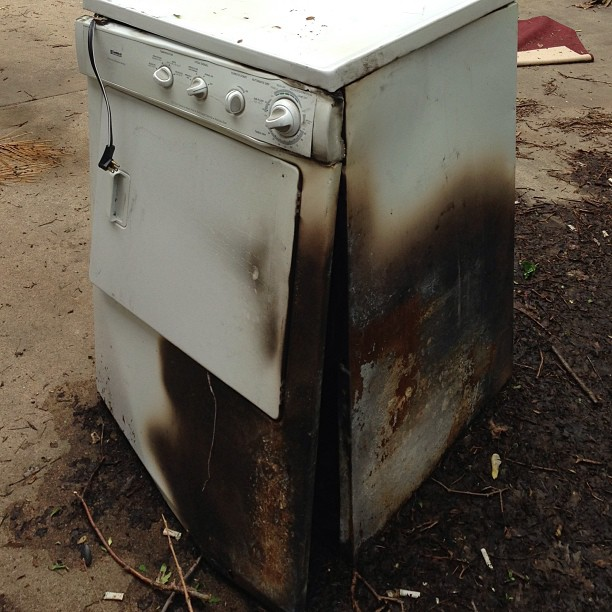
A clothes dryer that has been damaged by fire.

In the United States, an estimate from the US Fire Administration in a 2012 report estimated that from 2008 to 2010, fire departments responded to an estimated 2,900 clothes dryer fires in residential buildings each year across the nation. These fires resulted in an annual average loss of 5 deaths, 100 injuries, and $35 million in property loss. The Fire Administration attributes "Failure to clean" (34%) as the leading factor contributing to clothes dryer fires in residential buildings, and observed that new home construction trends place clothes dryers and washing machines in more hazardous locations away from outside walls, such as in bedrooms, second-floor hallways, bathrooms, and kitchens.

To address the problem of clothes dryer fires, a fire suppression system can be used with sensors to detect the change in temperature when a blaze starts in a dryer drum. These sensors then activate a water vapor mechanism to put out the fire.

== Environmental impact ==
The environmental impact of clothes dryers is especially severe in the US and Canada, where over 80% of all homes have a clothes dryer. According to the US Environmental Protection Agency, if all residential clothes dryers sold in the US were energy efficient, "the utility cost savings would grow to more than $1.5 billion each year and more than 10 billion kilograms (22 billion pounds) of annual greenhouse gas emissions would be prevented”.

Clothes dryers are second only to refrigerators and freezers as the largest residential electrical energy consumers in America.

In the European Union, the EU energy labeling system is applied to dryers; dryers are classified with a label from A+++ (best) to G (worst) according to the amount of energy used per kilogram of clothes (kW⋅h/kg). Sensor dryers can automatically sense that clothes are dry and switch off. This means over-drying is not as frequent. Most of the European market sells sensor dryers now, and they are normally available in condenser and vented dryers.

== History ==
A hand-cranked clothes dryer was created in 1800 by M. Pochon from France. The first patented automatic clothes dryer was invented by African American inventor George T. Sampson in 1892, utilizing a rack over a stove to safely dry clothes. George T. Sampson patented a machine (U.S. Patent #476,416) that used a frame to hold clothes over a stove, which was safer and more efficient than previous methods. Henry W. Altorfer invented and patented an electric clothes dryer in 1937. J. Ross Moore, an inventor from North Dakota, developed designs for automatic clothes dryers and published his design for an electrically operated dryer in 1938. Industrial designer Brooks Stevens developed an electric dryer with a glass window in the early 1940s.

== See also ==
- Laundry-folding machine
- List of home appliances
- Sheila Maid
- Shoe dryer
- Surge protector
