= Dhobi Ghat (disambiguation) =

Dhobi ghat is a general term in South Asia for an open-air laundry-place or washing-place.

Dhobi Ghat, or variant spellings, may also refer to:

- Dhobi Ghat (Mumbai), an open air laundry in Mumbai, India
- Dhobi Ghat (film), a 2010 Indian drama film
- Dhobi Ghat Park, a park in Pakistan
- Dhoby Ghaut, a place in Singapore
- Dhoby Ghaut, Penang, a place in Penang
- Dhobaghat, or Udayapurkot, a village in Rapti Zone, Nepal

== See also ==
- Dhobi, washermen in South Asia
- Ghat (disambiguation)
- Laundry
- Lavoir
- Self-service laundry
- List of laundry topics
