= Auxon, Aube =

Commune in Grand Est, France

Auxon
- Commune
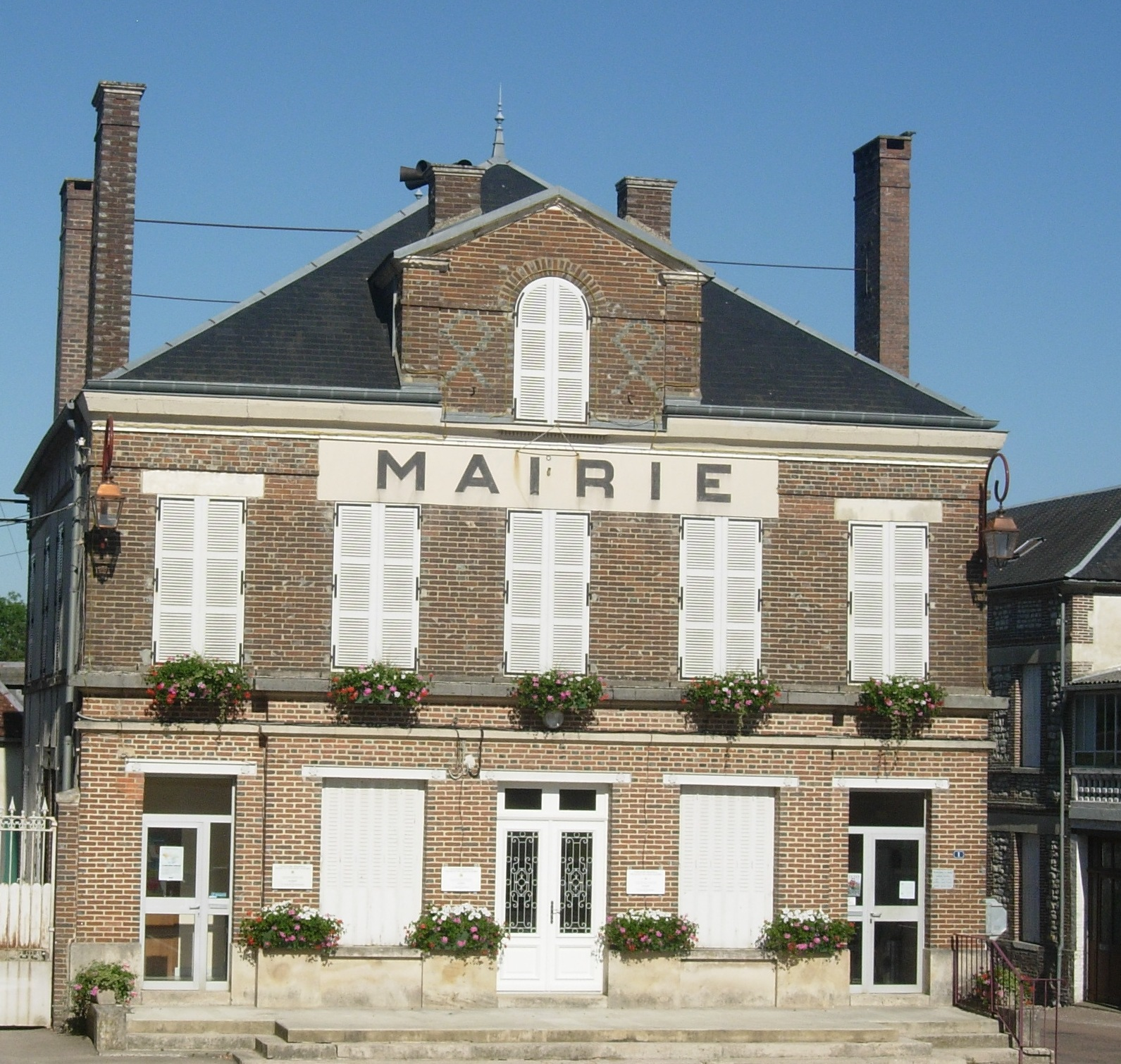
- The Town Hall

- Coat of arms
- Location of Auxon
- Location within France Location within Grand Est
- Coordinates: 48°06′17″N 3°55′12″E
- Country: France
- Region: Grand Est
- Department: Aube
- Arrondissement: Troyes
- Canton: Aix-Villemaur-Pâlis
- Intercommunality: CC Chaourçois Val Armance

Government
  - Mayor (2020–2026): Thierry Lorne
- Area^{1}: 25.49 km^{2} (9.84 sq mi)
- Elevation: 157 m (515 ft)
- Population (2023): 886
  - Density: 34.8/km^{2} (90.0/sq mi)
- Time zone: UTC+01:00 (CET)
  - Summer (DST): UTC+02:00 (CEST)
- INSEE/Postal code: 10018 /10130
- ^{1} French Land Register data, which excludes lakes, ponds, glaciers > 1 km^{2} (0.386 sq mi or 247 acres) and river estuaries.

Auxon (French pronunciation: [osɔ̃]) is a commune in the Aube département in the Grand Est region of north-eastern France.

The commune has been awarded three flowers by the National Council of Towns and Villages in Bloom in the Competition of cities and villages in Bloom.

== Geography ==
Auxon is located some 22 kilometres (14 mi) south-west of Troyes and 22 km north-east of Saint-Florentin. Access to the commune is by Route nationale N77 from Villeneuve-au-Chemin in the west which passes just to the north of the village and continues north-east to Villery. The D374 comes from Maraye-en-Othe in the north, passes through the village, and continues to Ervy-le-Châtel in the south. The D1 road goes east from the D374 to Montigny-les-Monts. Apart from the village there are the hamlets of Sivrey, Vert, Courtelon, Roncenay, Les Croisettes, and La Coudre. The commune is mixed forest and farmland with especially large forests in the north.

The Armance forms the southern border of the commune as it flows west becoming the Armançon then following the Canal de Bourgogne to join the Yonne at Migennes. The Saussol flows south down the western side of the commune to join the Armance east of Ervy-le-Châtel. The Ru de Sivrey rises near Sivrey and flows south to join the Saussol as does the Ru d'Auxon which rises near the village. The Ru de Vert rises near Vert and also flows south to join the Saussol. The Ruisseau de Montigny flows across the south of the commune from north-east to south-west and joins the Armance on the southern border of the commune.

== History ==
In 1846 the commune of Eaux-Puiseaux was created from the territory of the commune of Auxon.

=== Heraldry ===
Arms of Auxon	These are the arms of Edme of Pont and Hugues of Conflans. Blazon: Azure, an eagle of Or, in chief Gules billety of Or.

== Administration ==
List of Successive Mayors

From	To	Name	Party	Position
	1857	Vioix-Parmentier		
	1887	Sainton		
	1887	Moniot		
	2001	Franck Simard	RPR	General Councillor
2001	2009	Jean-Louis Caillet	DVD	Retired
2009	2026	Thierry Lorne	DVD	Farmer

== Demography ==
The inhabitants of the commune are known as Alsoniens or Alsoniennes in French.

Historical population

Year	Pop.	±% p.a.
1793	2,336	—
1800	2,309	−0.17%
1806	2,136	−1.29%
1821	2,195	+0.18%
1831	2,400	+0.90%
1836	2,252	−1.26%
1841	2,507	+2.17%
1846	2,443	−0.52%
1851	1,719	−6.79%
1856	1,606	−1.35%
1861	1,589	−0.21%
1866	1,605	+0.20%
1872	1,502	−1.10%
1876	1,540	+0.63%
1881	1,403	−1.85%
1886	1,323	−1.17%
1891	1,359	+0.54%
1896	1,230	−1.97%
1901	1,137	−1.56%

Year	Pop.	±% p.a.
1906	1,109	−0.50%
1911	1,115	+0.11%
1921	920	−1.90%
1926	931	+0.24%
1931	863	−1.51%
1936	843	−0.47%
1946	820	−0.28%
1954	843	+0.35%
1962	812	−0.47%
1968	801	−0.23%
1975	764	−0.67%
1982	861	+1.72%
1990	905	+0.62%
1999	927	+0.27%
2007	971	+0.58%
2012	941	−0.63%
2017	1,005	+1.32%
2023	886	−2.08%

Source: EHESS and INSEE

== Culture and heritage ==
=== Religious heritage ===
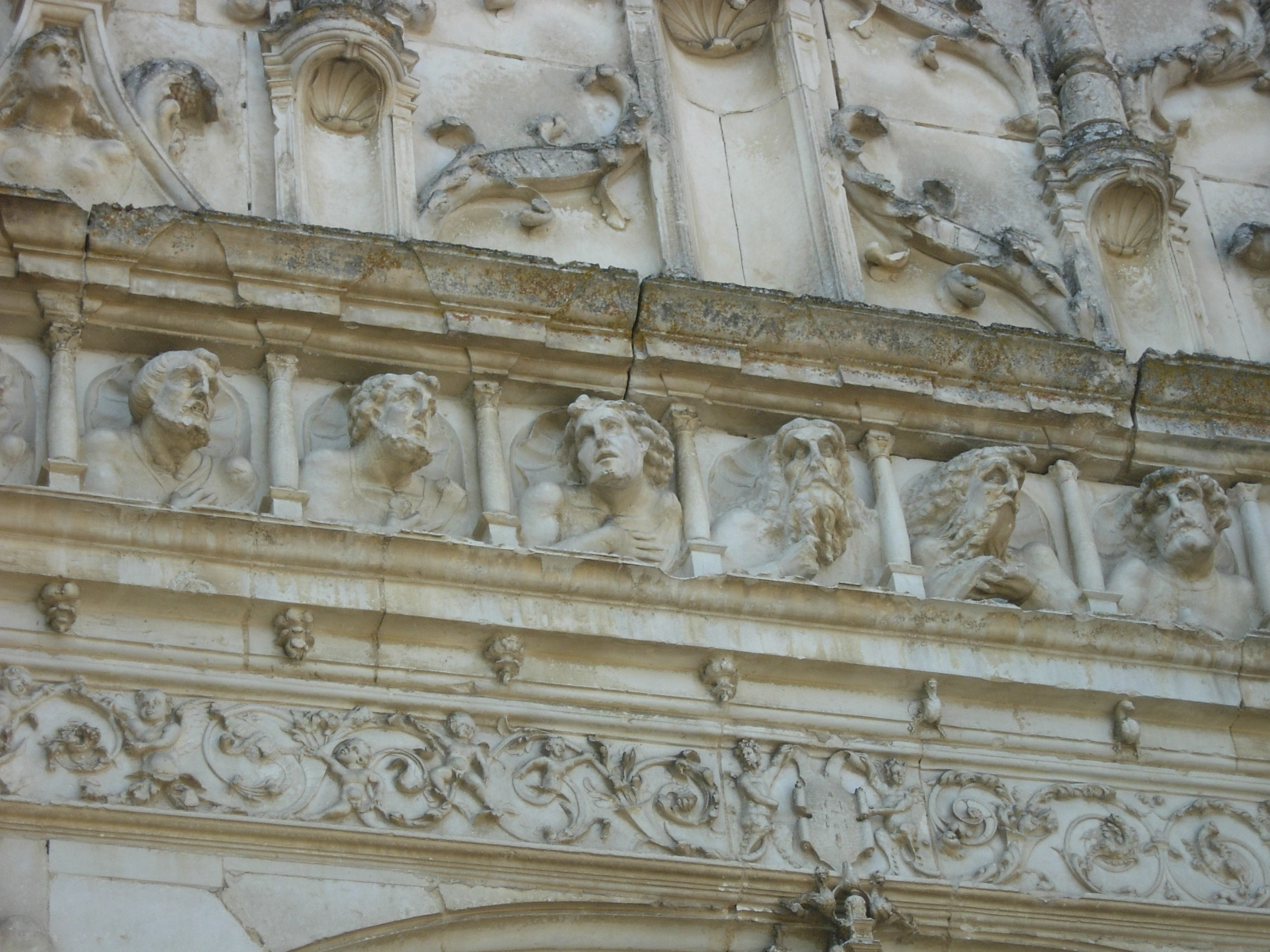
Detail on the Church of Saint-Loup-de-Sens

The commune has one religious building that is registered as an historical monument:

- The Parish Church of Saint-Loup-de-Sens (16th century). The church was once in the Diocese of Sens (Yonne) and the seat of a priest conferred by the abbot of Saint-Pierre-le-Vif-lès-Sens. Started on the eastern side in 1506, it was completed by 1550. The South portal was complete in 1537 and the west portal in 1540. The western arches and the tower were built in the 17th century. The Church contains a very large number of items that are registered as historical objects.
- The Chapel of Notre-Dame de la Coudre contains several items that are registered as historical objects:
  - A Processional Cross (12th century)
  - A Statue: Virgin and Child (disappeared) (14th century)
  - A Bronze Bell (disappeared) (1563)
  - The Furniture in the Chapel
- The Hamlet of Sivrey: its chapel and its Lavoir
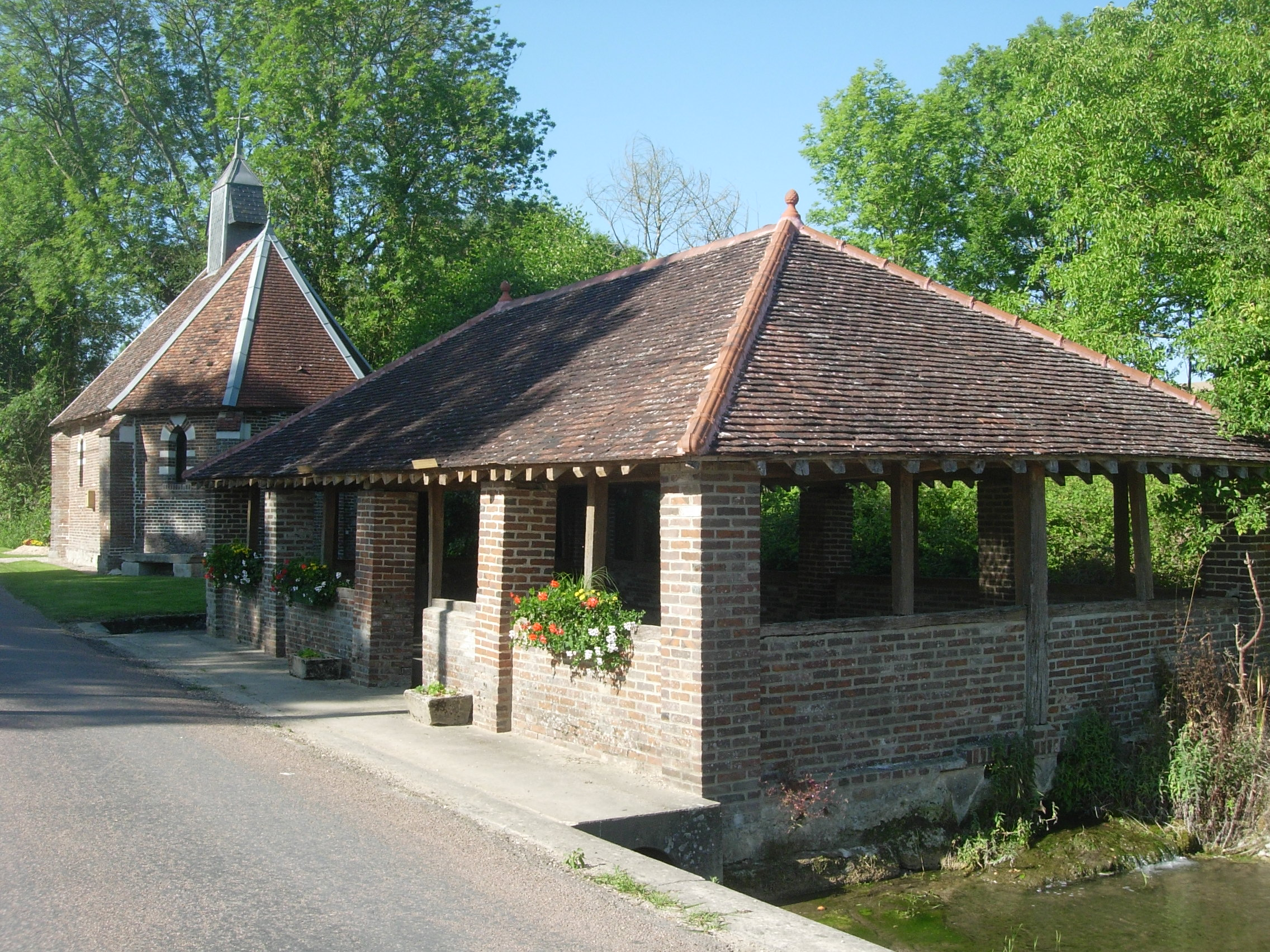
The Chapel and the Lavoir (Public laundry) at Sivrey.

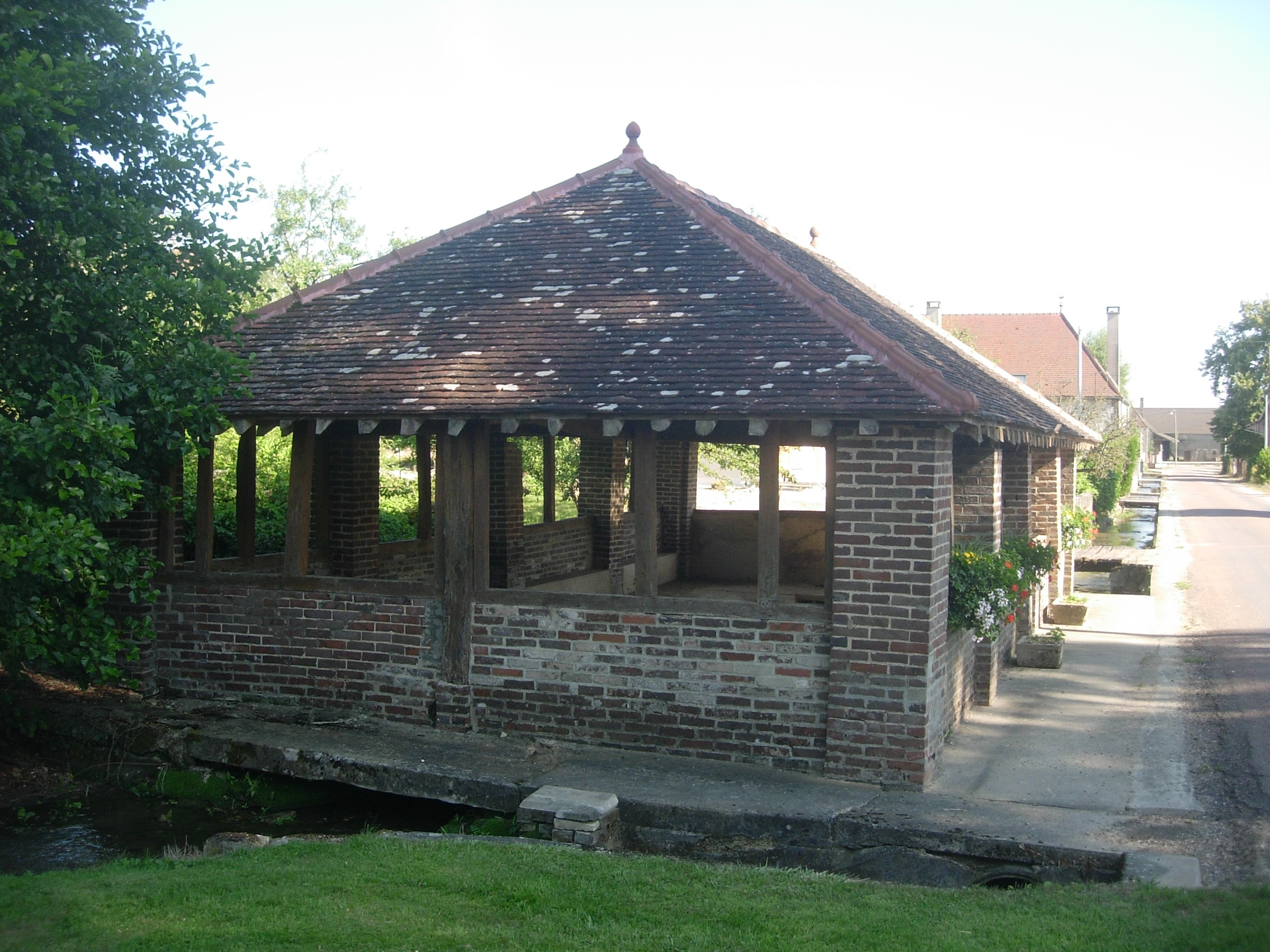
The Sivrey Lavoir.

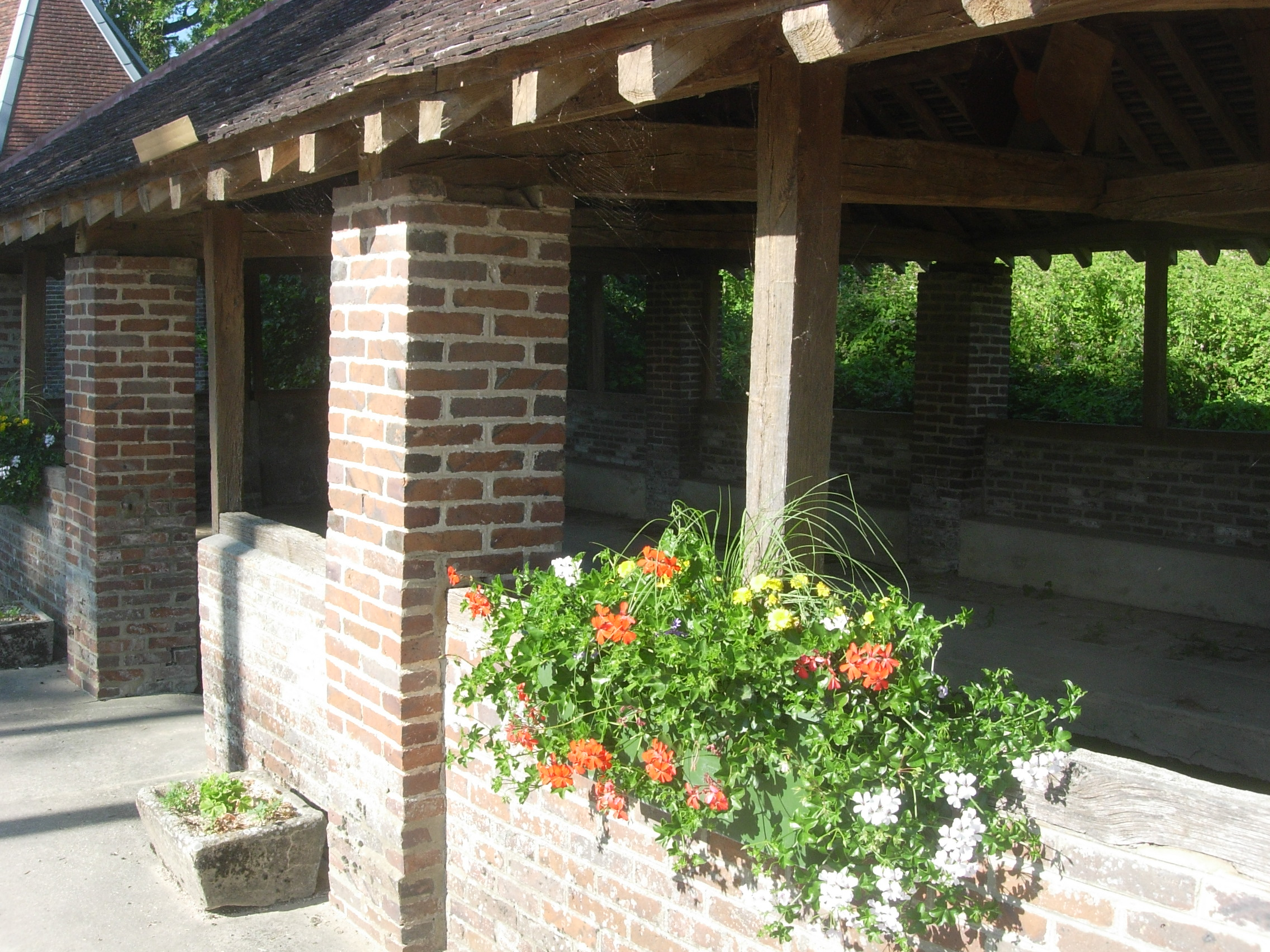
The Sivrey Lavoir with flowers

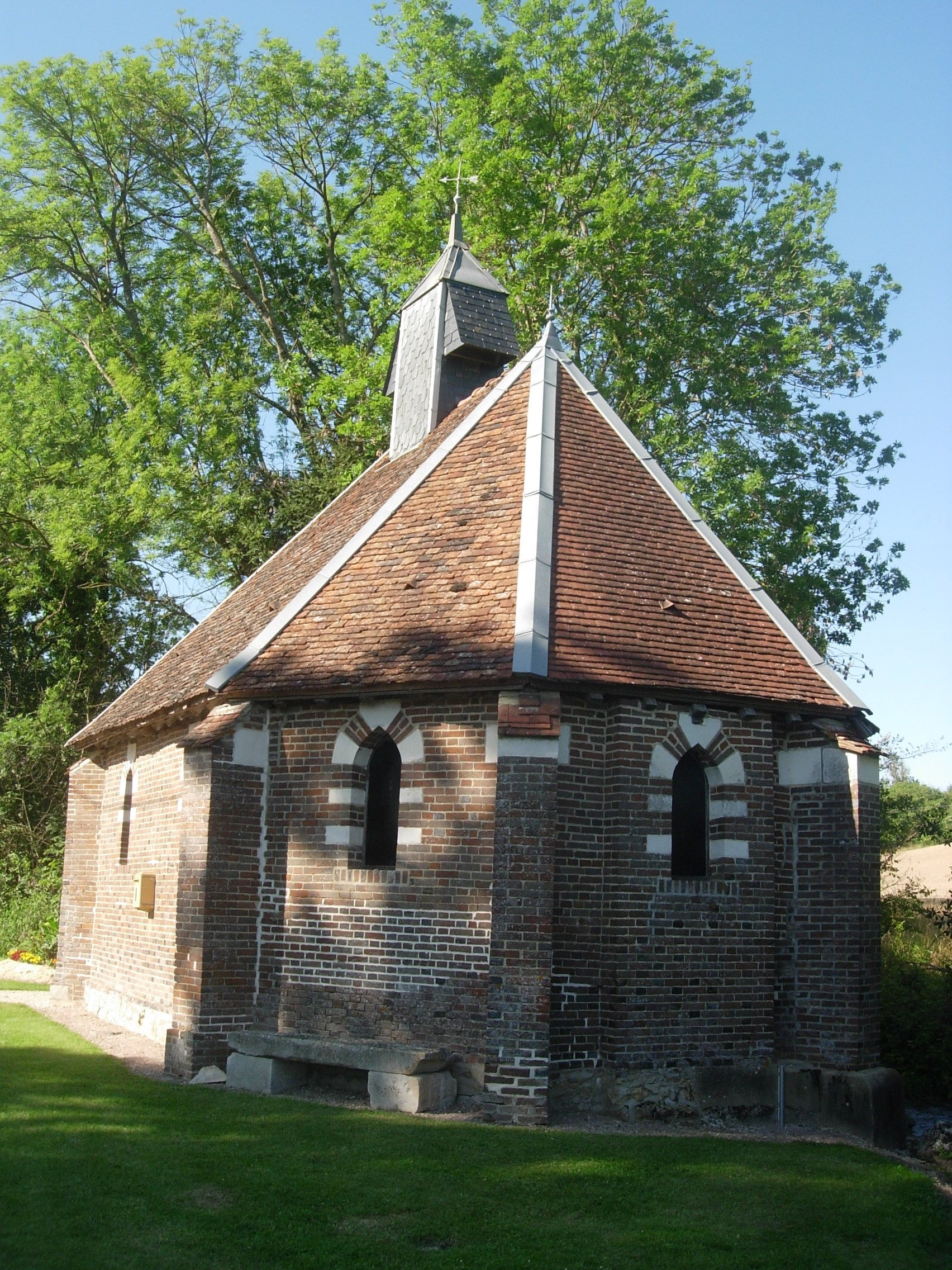
The Sivrey Chapel

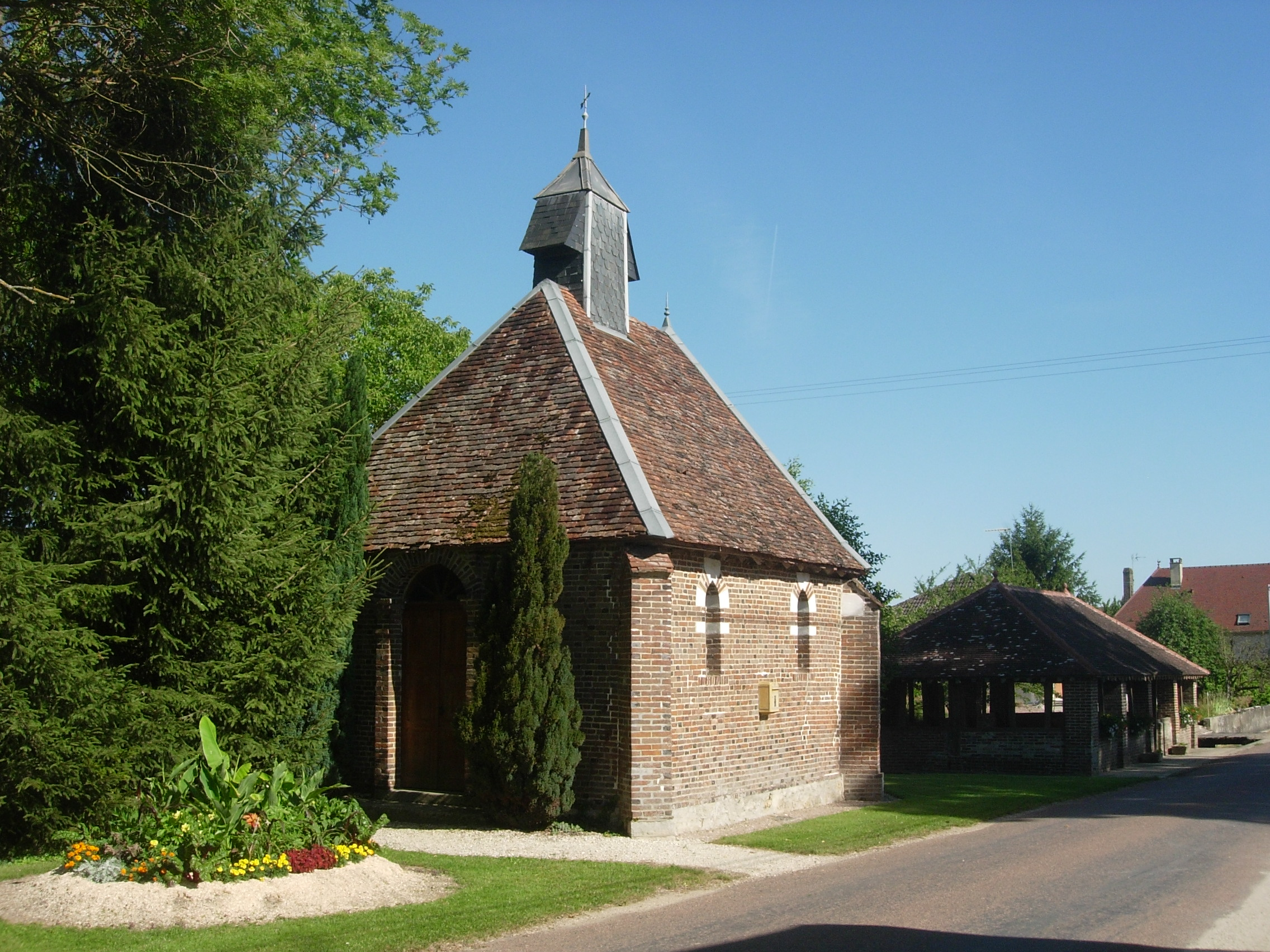
The Sivrey Chapel

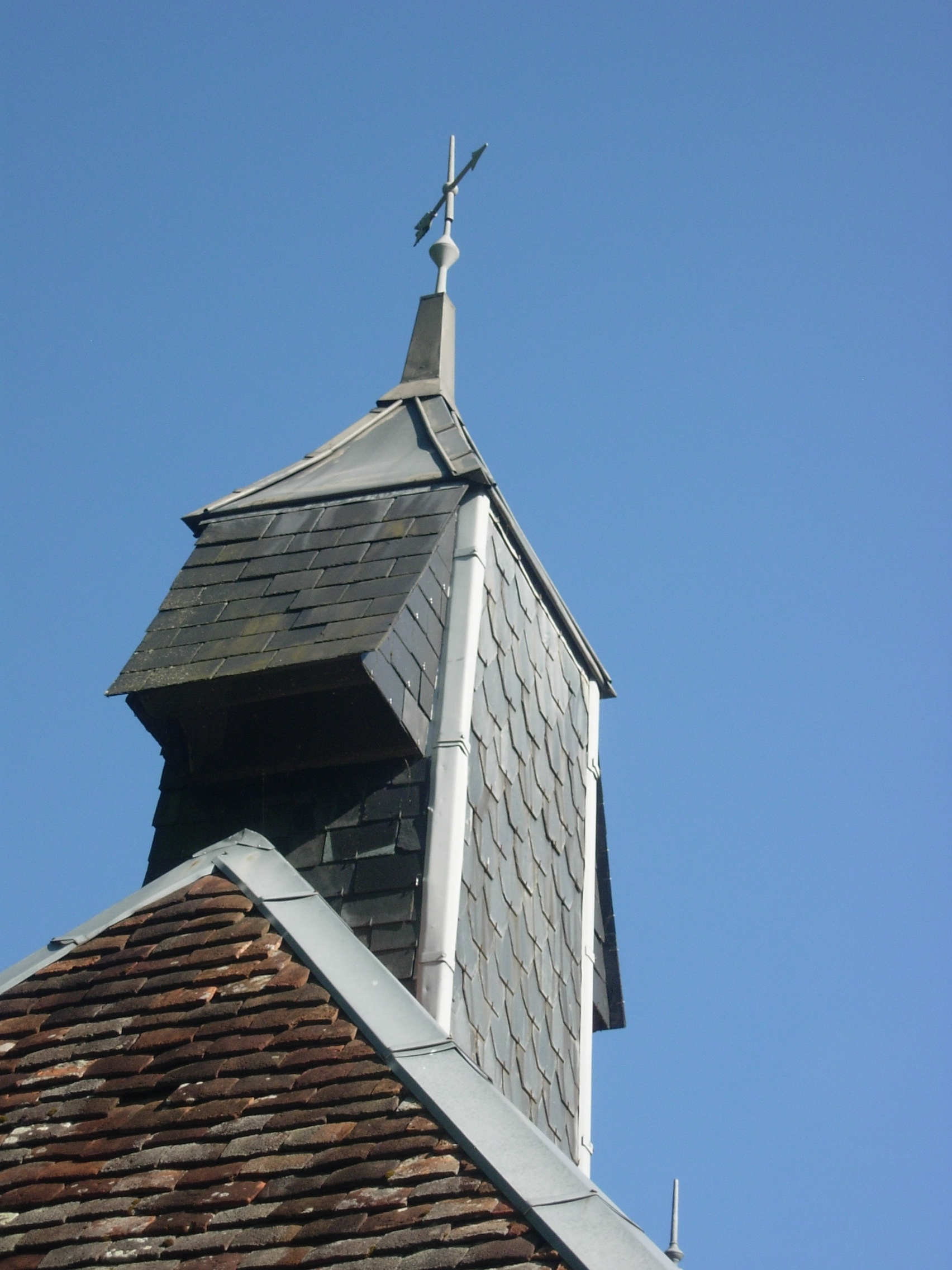
The Sivrey Chapel

== Notable people linked to the commune ==
- Georges Alexis Mocquery (1772-1847), General in the Army of the Republic and the Empire, born at Auxon and died at Tours.
- Parfait Jans, politician and writer, died on 24 August 2011 at Auxon.

== See also ==
- Communes of the Aube department

=== Bibliography ===
- Charles Fichot, Monumental Statistics of Aube department, Vol. II., Paris. 1888, reprinted by Sancey, Saint-Julien-les-Villas, 1980, p. 9 & 10 (dedicated to the church, the statuettes of the Retable from the old main altar by the sculptor from Troyes François Joseph Valtat).
