= Ghaut =

Ghaut may refer to:

- Ghat, either a range of stepped hills with valleys, or the series of steps leading down to a body of water
- Ghaut, a watercourse in Basseterre Valley, Saint Kitts and Nevis, and Centre Hills, Montserrat
- The Ghauts, a rocky ridge by Limekilns, Fife, Scotland

== See also ==
- Ghat (disambiguation)
- Dhoby Ghaut, a place in Singapore
- Dhoby Ghaut, Penang, a place in Malaysia
