= Dhobi Ghat (Mumbai) =

Open air commercial laundry in Mumbai; a generic term for the same throughout India

Coordinates: 18°58′58.52″N 72°49′31.47″E

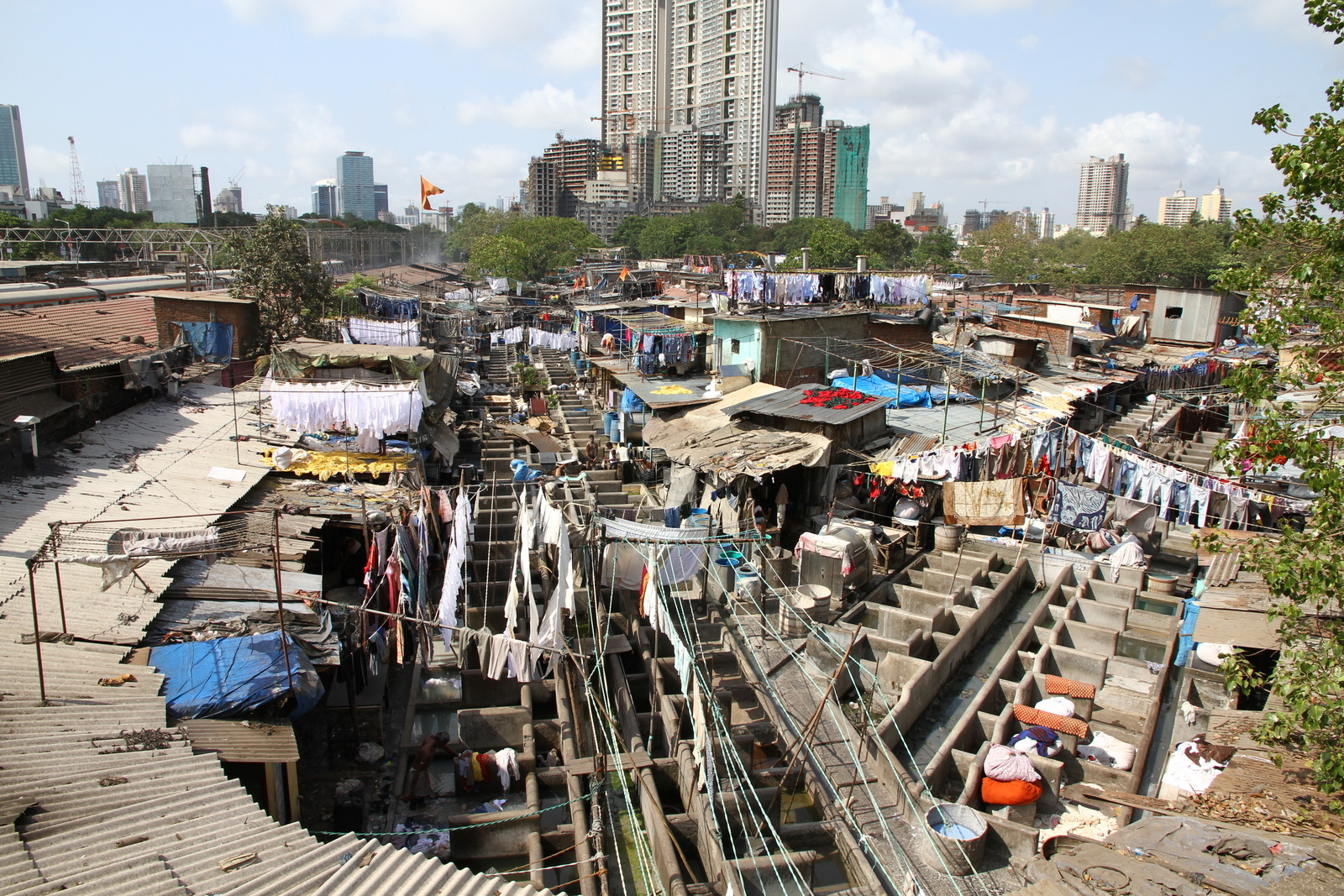
Mumbai Dhobi Ghat Laundry District

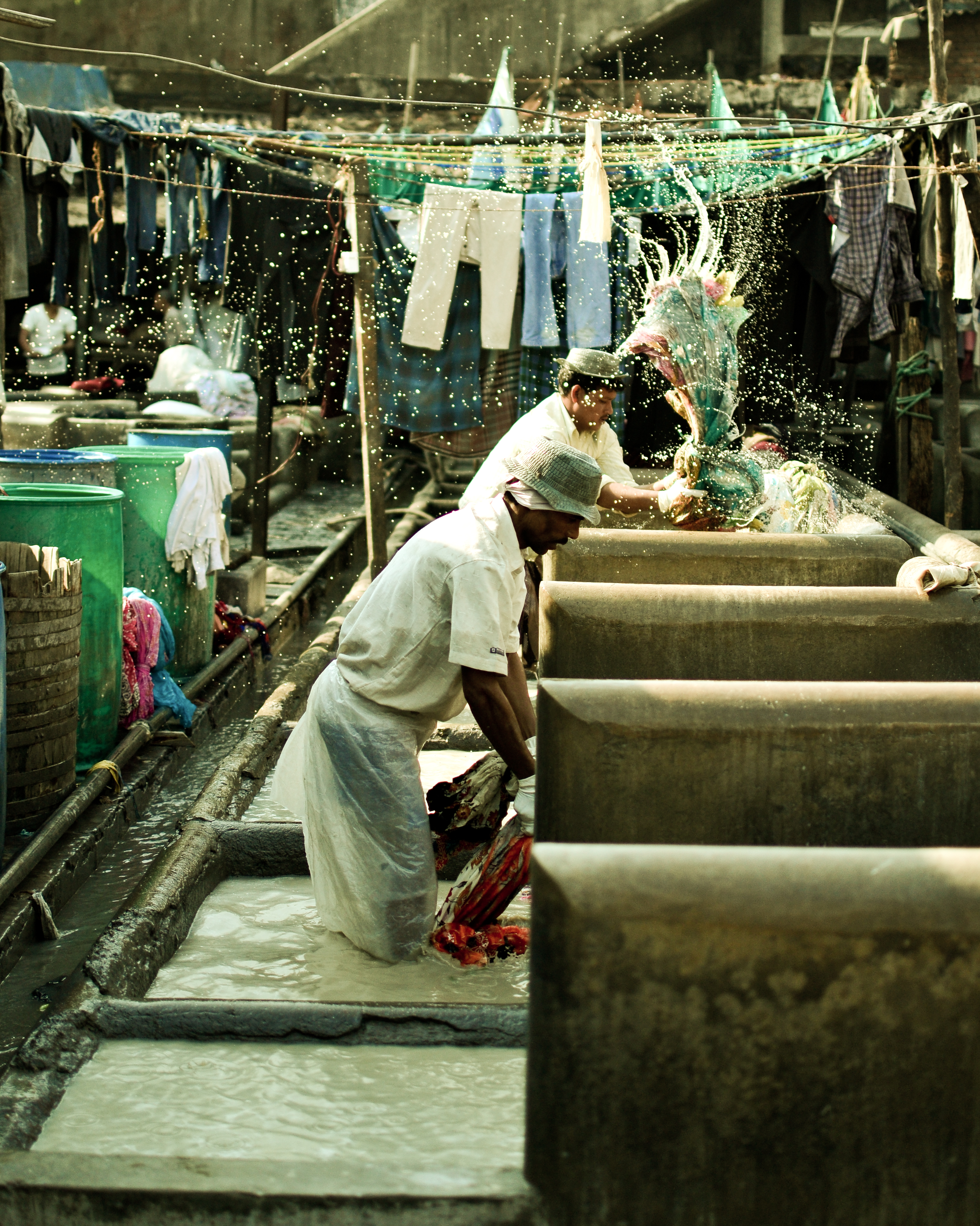
Individual wash pens at Dhobi Ghat

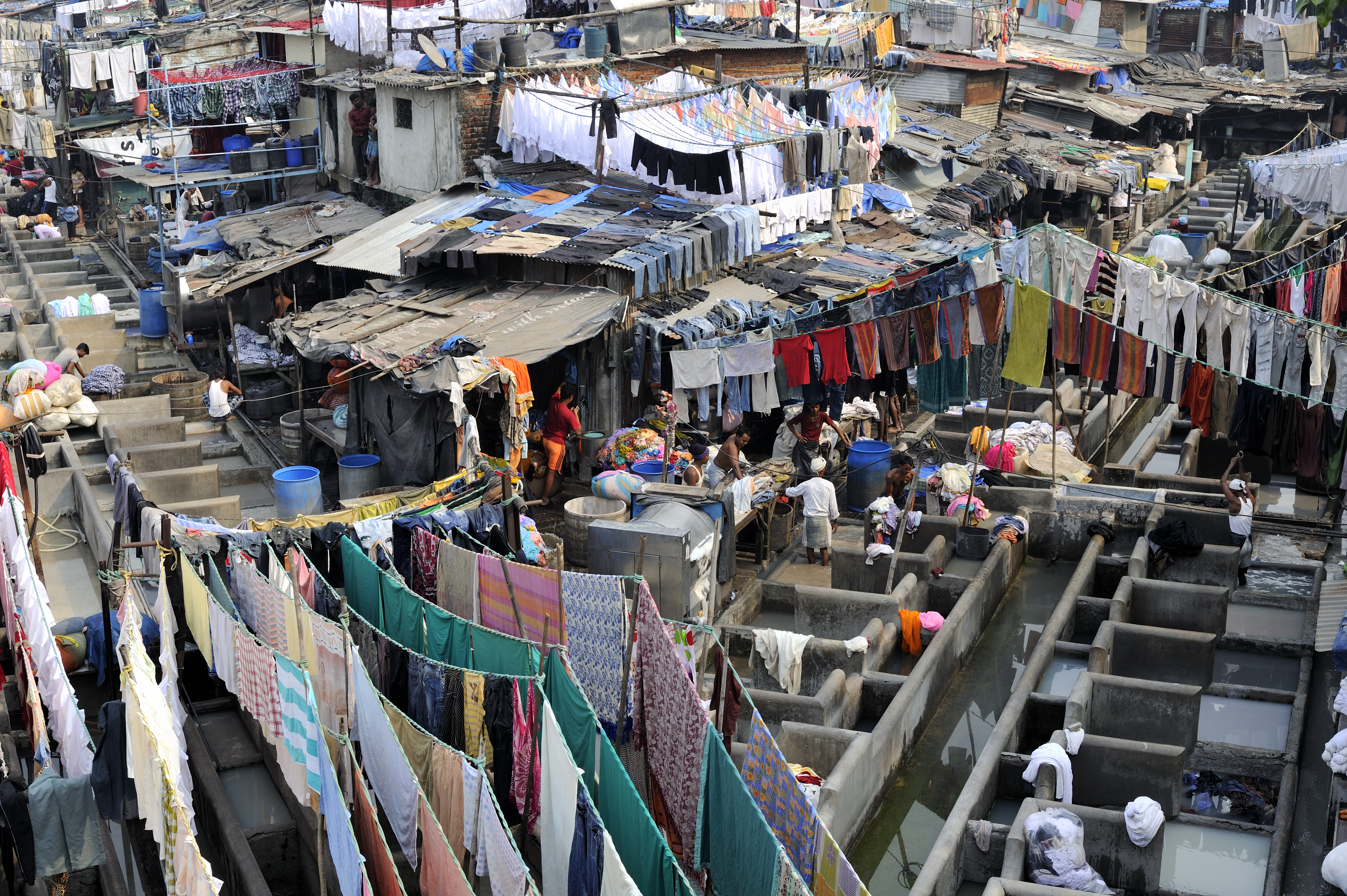
Mumbaikar dhobis at work in the Mahalaxmi area

Dhobi Ghat is an open air laundry in Mumbai, India. It was constructed in 1890. The washers, known as dhobis, work in the open to wash clothes and linens from Mumbai's hotels and hospitals.

The phrase dhobi ghat is used all over India to refer to any place where many washers are present. Inspired by the Mumbai Dhobi Ghat (then Bombay), the British built Dhobi Ghat in Kolkata (then Calcutta) in 1902 and there are other dhobi ghat places elsewhere in southern Asia.

== Overview ==
There are rows of open-air concrete wash pens, each fitted with its own flogging stone. Claimed to be the world's largest outdoor laundry, Dhobi Ghat is a very popular attraction among foreign tourists.

It is located next to Mahalaxmi railway station on the Western Railway suburban line in southern Mumbai. It is also accessible from the Jacob Circle monorail station and the Mahalaxmi Metro Station on the Aqua Line of Mumbai Metro. It is located near the Saat Rasta roundabout.

The Dhobi Kalyan & Audhyogik Vikas Cooperative Society, the apex body that represents washermen, estimates the annual turnover of the Mahalaxmi Dhobi Ghat at around Rs 100 crore. For 18 to 20 hours each day, over 7,000 people flog, scrub, dye and bleach clothes on concrete wash pens, dry them on ropes, neatly press them and transport the garments to different parts of the city. Over one lakh (100,000) clothes are washed each day. Some of the wealthier dhobis have given up on manual cleaning and have now installed large mechanical washing and drying machines. The dhobis collect clothes from all parts of the city, from Colaba to Virar. Their biggest clients are neighbourhood laundries, garment dealers, wedding decorators and caterers, and mid-sized hotels and clubs.

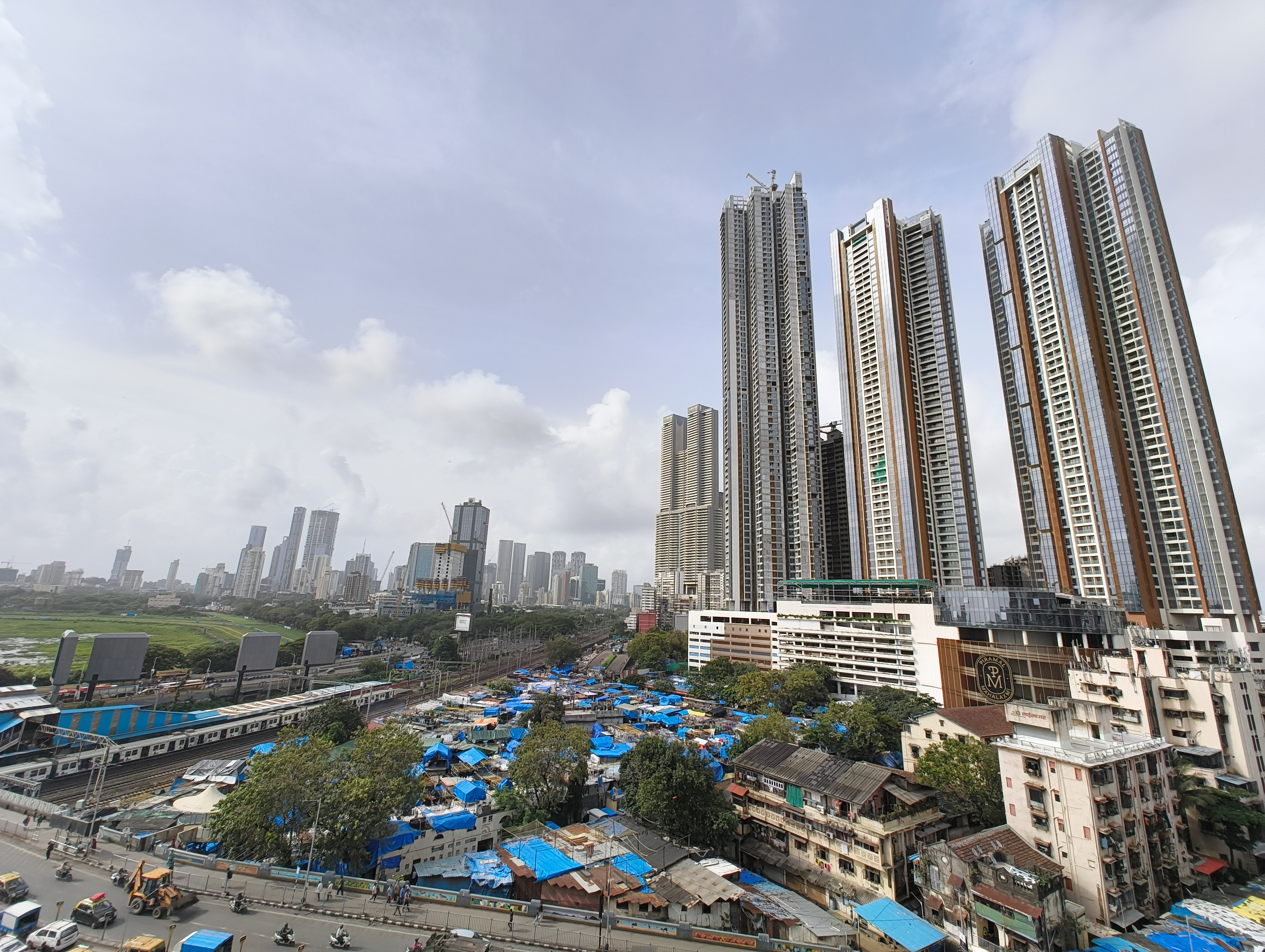
Dhobi Ghat view in year 2025

The Saat Rasta Project is a proposed Public Space Project along the Bapurao Jagtap Road, connecting Jacob Circle to the Mahalaxmi Railway Station. This public space will connect to Dhobi Ghat, which is also a major tourist attraction. Home to the dhobis and their families (around 200 families), the Dhobi Ghat has seen this occupation passed down from one generation to the next.

== See also ==
- Dhoby Ghaut, Singapore
- Dhoby Ghaut, Penang, Malaysia
