= Porte Saint-Nicolas (Ervy-le-Châtel) =

Historic gate in Ervy-le-Châtel, France

Coordinates: 48.0414°N 3.9125°E

Porte Saint-Nicolas (St. Nicolas gate) is an historic gate in the French village of Ervy-le-Châtel, in the department of Aube.

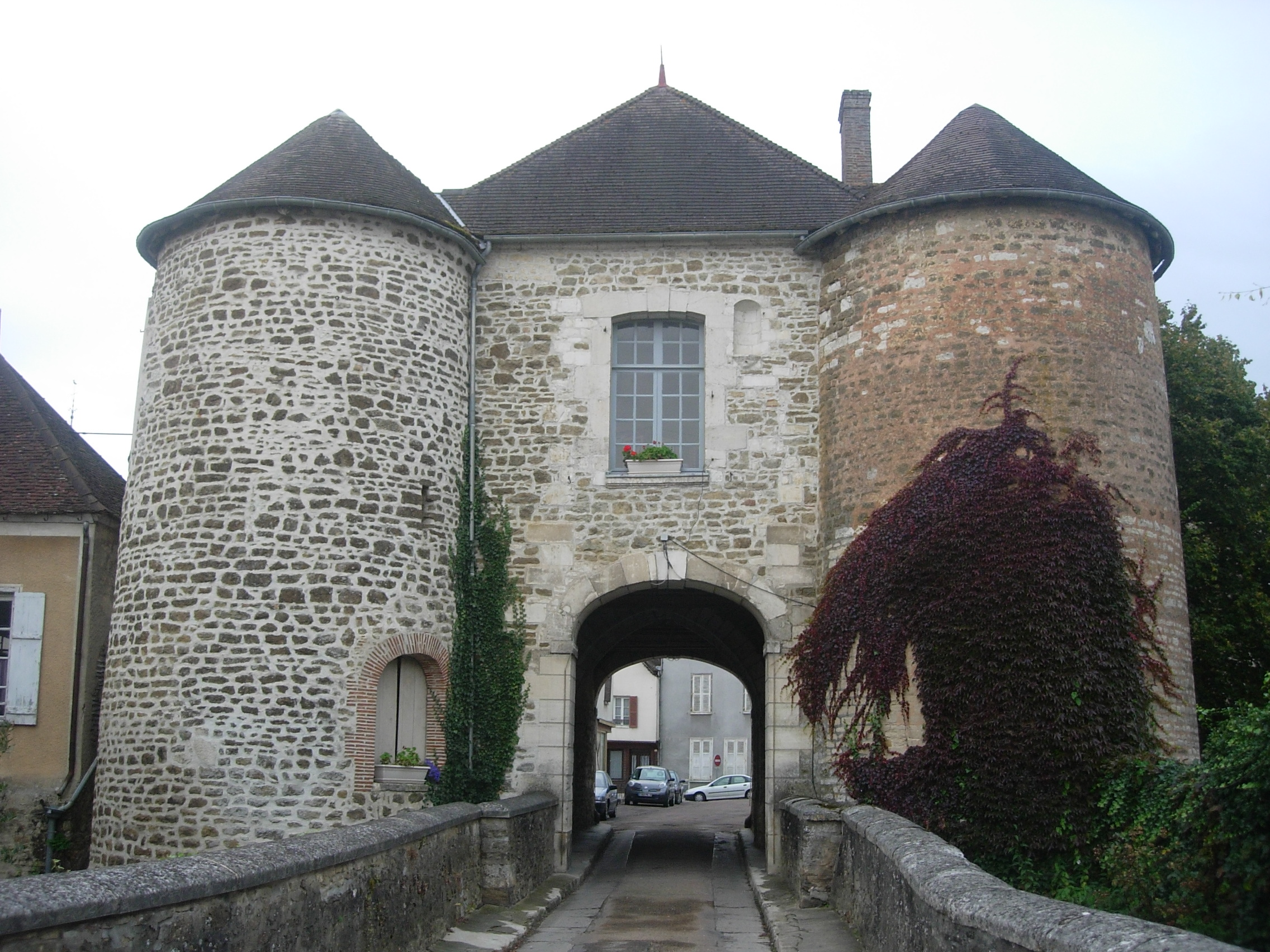
Ervy le Châtel Porte Saint Nicolas octobre 2008 01

== History ==
Porte Saint-Nicolas takes its name from a small statue of the saint on the inside of the gate. It was built in the 16th century to provide access to the walled medieval town, and was originally approached from the outside by way of a wooden drawbridge. The northern of the two towers was used as a temporary prison.

In 1837, the towers were rebuilt and the drawbridge replaced with a permanent stone bridge.

It is the only surviving medieval gate in Aube.
