= Arboretum Saint-Antoine =

Arboretum in Champagne-Ardenne, France

Coordinates: 48.04°N 3.91°E

The Arboretum Saint-Antoine, also known as the Arboretum d'Ervy-le-Châtel, is an arboretum located in Ervy-le-Châtel, Aube, Champagne-Ardenne, France. It is open weekdays but closed in July and August.

The arboretum dates from the 18th century, and is located on the grounds of Saint Antoine church. It contains more than 700 types of conifers, three hundred Japanese maples, and about a hundred magnolias.

== See also ==
- List of botanical gardens in France
