= Round hall (Ervy-le-Châtel) =

The round hall of Ervy-le-châtel is in Ervy-le-Châtel, in the Aube department in the north-east of France. It was built at the beginning of the 19th century on the old moats of the city. It used to be a shelter for merchants. Its construction began in 1836 and it was finished in 1837. At the beginning, it was used as a shelter for mongers and now it's the tourist information office. This building was repaired in 1960. Today a part of it is used as a tourist information center and the other part is used for exhibitions. This monument appeared in the historic monuments list in 1947.
