= Dhobi ghat =

Laundry place

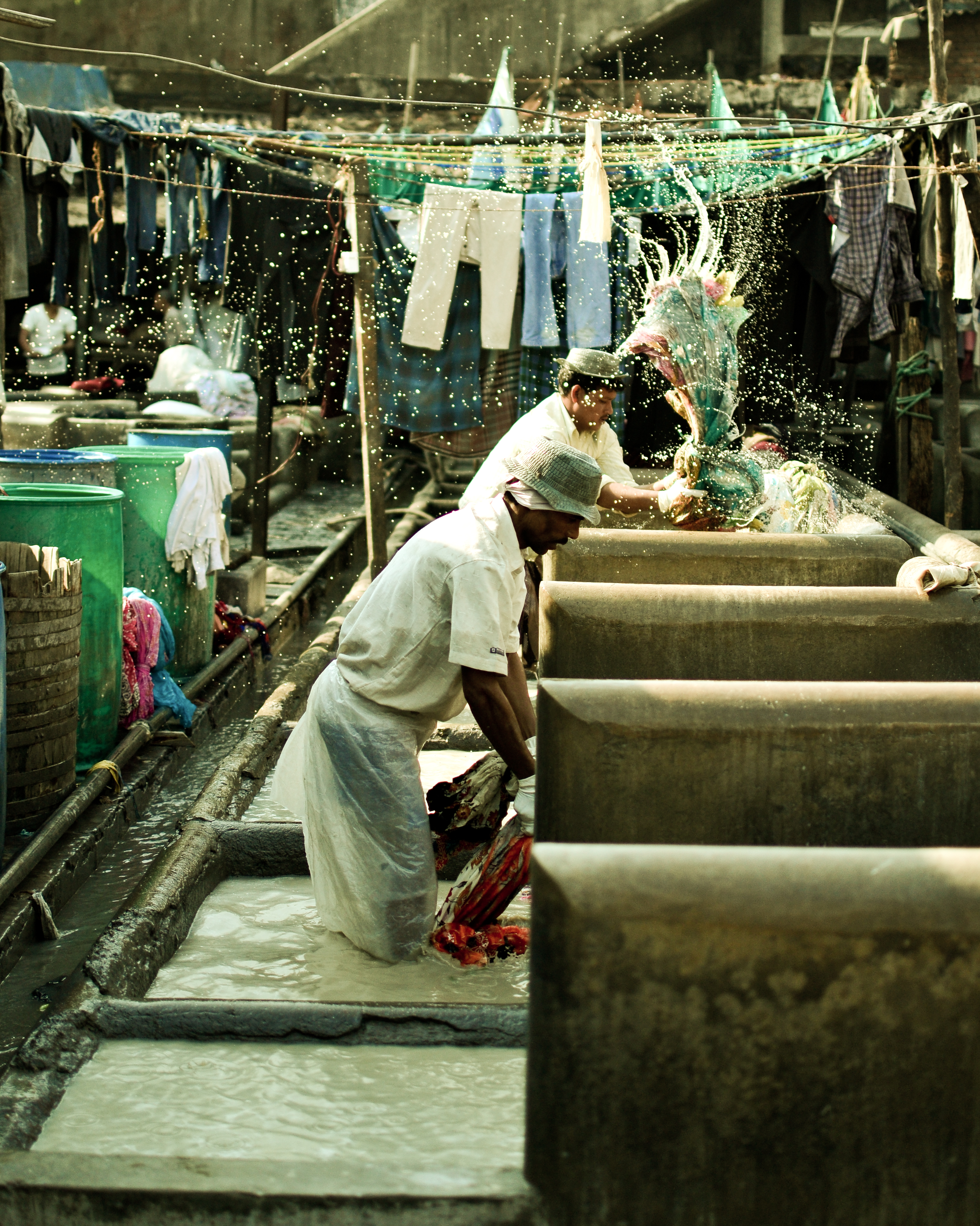
Dhobhis (Washermen) washing clothes at Dhobhi Ghat, Mahalaxmi, Mumbai

Dhobi ghat or dhobighaat is used throughout south-central Asia to refer to any laundry-place or washing-place where many launderers or clothes-washers are present; they may be ordinary people or professionals (traditionally men) who use the place to wash clothes and other linen. Mumbai has several other dhobi ghats, including an extensive dhobi ghat known as Mahalaxmi Dhobi Ghat.

By comparison, although the differences are subtle, a lavoir in Europe is usually an officially-constructed public washing-place in a village, frequently walled or enclosed, and often roofed; a laundry is an organisation providing laundry service or a place where clothes are washed; and a laundromat or launderette is a place with mechanised or automated laundry machines, usually but not always self-service.

== Etymology and use as a place name ==
Dhoby ghaut or dhobī ghāṭ (Hindi: धोबी घाट, Punjabi: ਧੋਬੀ ਘਾਟ, Tamil: தோபி காட்) (literally 'washing place'), is from dhobi 'washerman' or one that does laundry, and ghat, generically meaning a large open space, and a water-course, pond, wharf or berth.

Dhobi ghat has also come to be used as a place name in many different towns, and sometimes the name of a whole area. These names may persist after the disappearance of the original function of the place, for example:

- Mahalaxshmi Dhobi Ghat in Mumbai, India; reputedly the largest open-air laundry in the world
- Dhoby Ghaut, a district in Singapore
- Dhoby Ghaut, Penang, Malaysia

== See also ==
- List of laundry topics
- Dhobi Ghat, the movie
