= Lavoir =

Public place for the washing of clothes

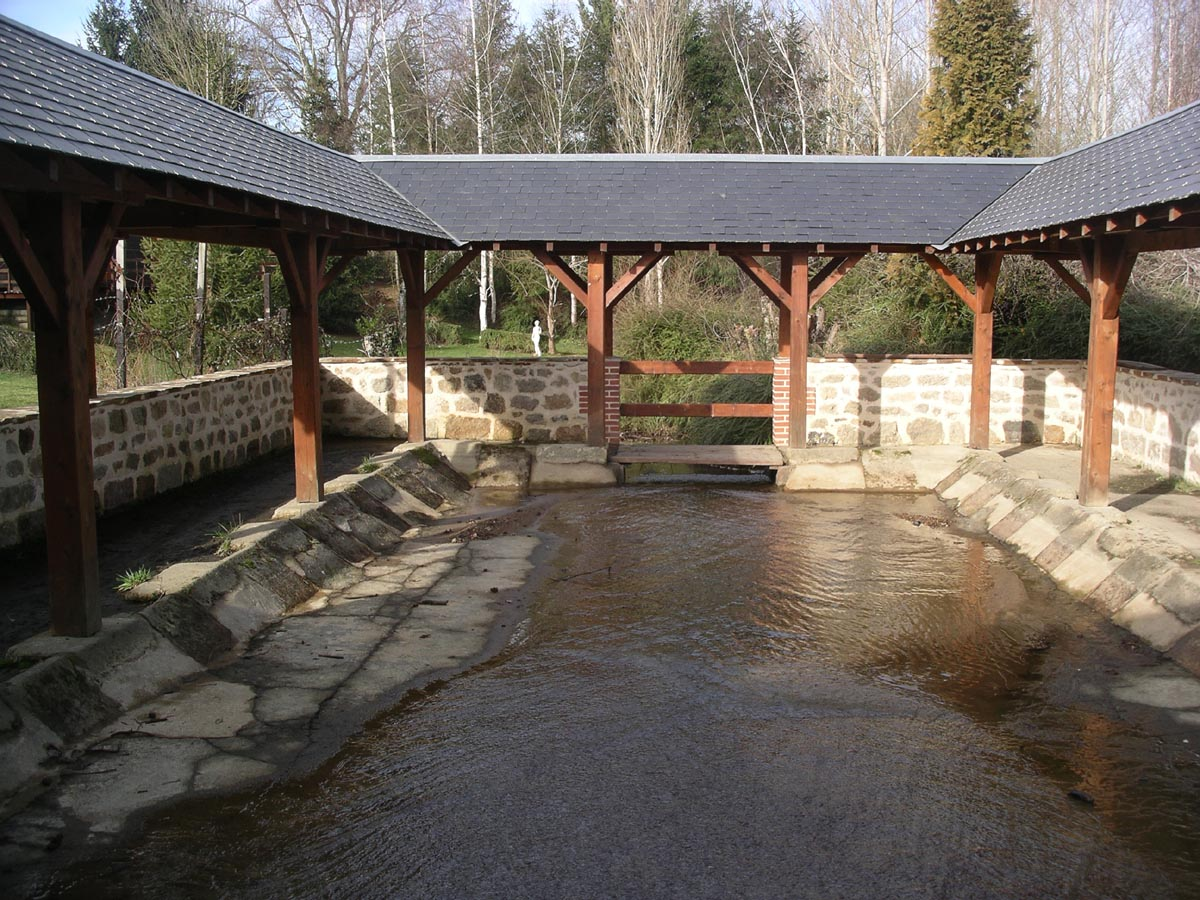
The restored lavoir at Bonnat straddling a small stream

A lavoir (French pronunciation: [lavwaʁ], wash-house) is a public place set aside for the washing of clothes. Communal washing places were common in Europe until industrial washing was introduced, and this process in turn was replaced by domestic washing machines and by self-service laundries (British English: laundrette; American English: laundromat). The English word is borrowed from the French language, which also uses the expression bassin public, "public basin".

== Description ==
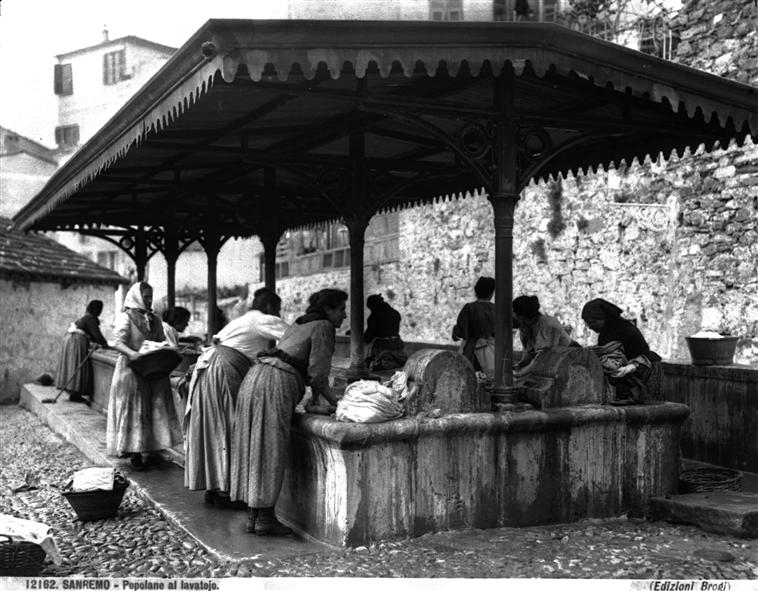
Women doing laundry in San Remo, Italy

Lavoirs were built from the seventeenth to the early twentieth centuries. With Baron Haussmann's redesign of Paris in the 1850s, a free lavoir was established in every neighbourhood, and government grants encouraged municipalities across France to construct their own. Lavoirs are more common in certain areas, such as around the Canal du Midi.

Lavoirs are commonly sited on a spring or set over or beside a river. Many lavoirs are provided with roofs for shelter. With the coming of piped water supplies and modern drainage, lavoirs have been steadily falling into disuse although a number of communities have restored ancient lavoirs, some of which date back to the 10th century.

There are also bateaux-lavoirs ("laundry boats") in some towns on the banks of large rivers such as Paris and Lyon.

== Gallery ==
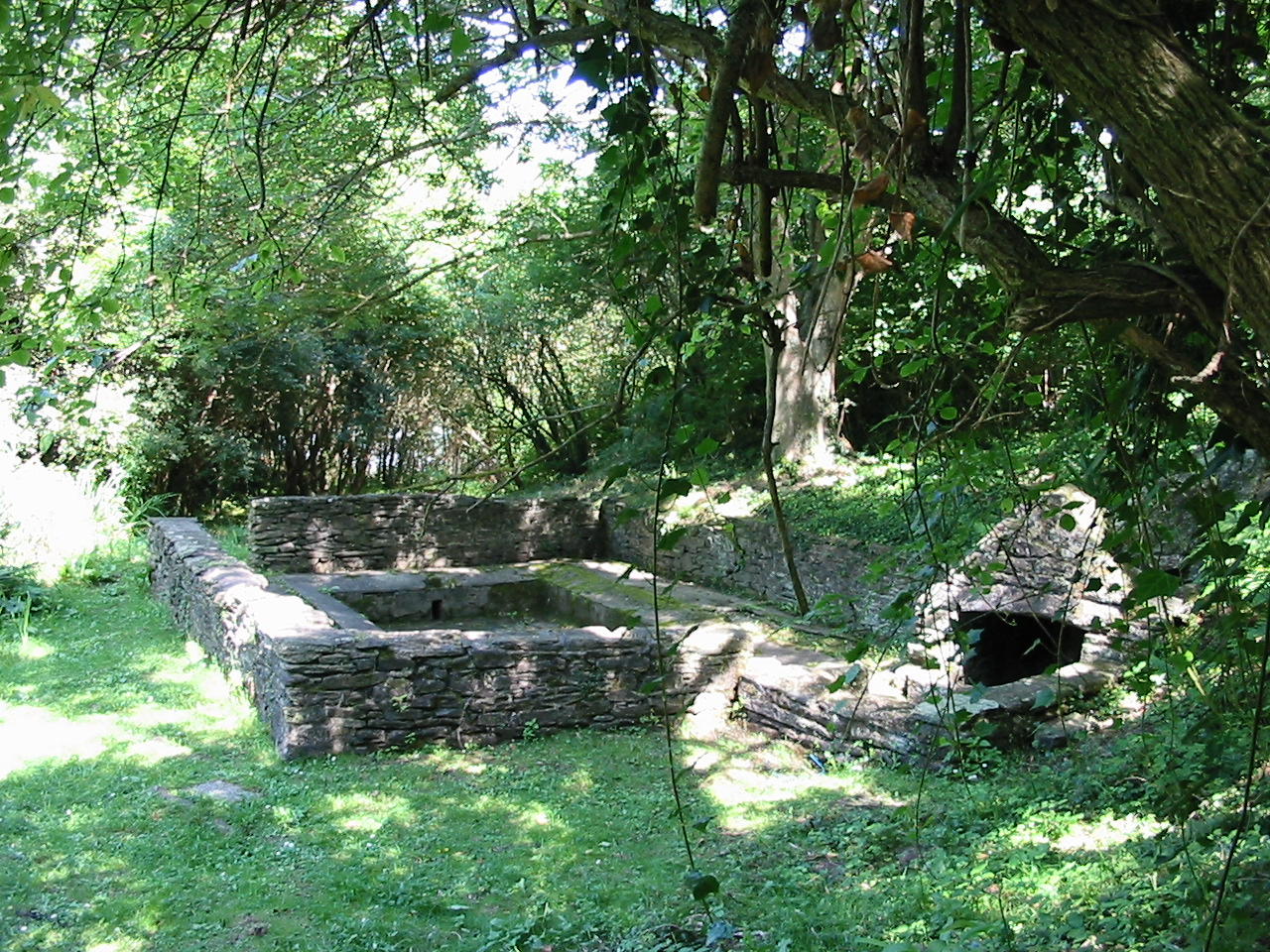
A lavoir at Groix

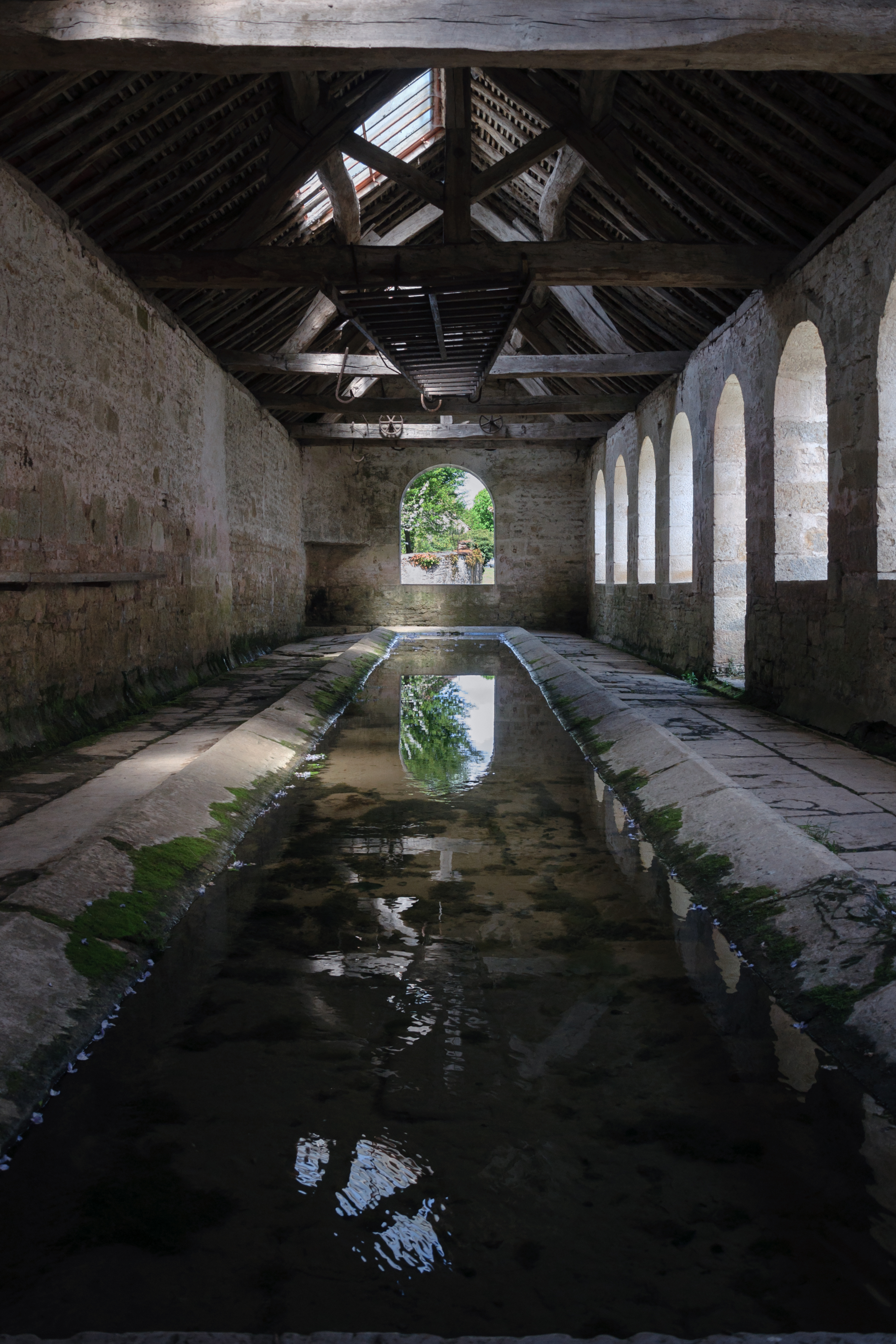
Lavoir at Noyers

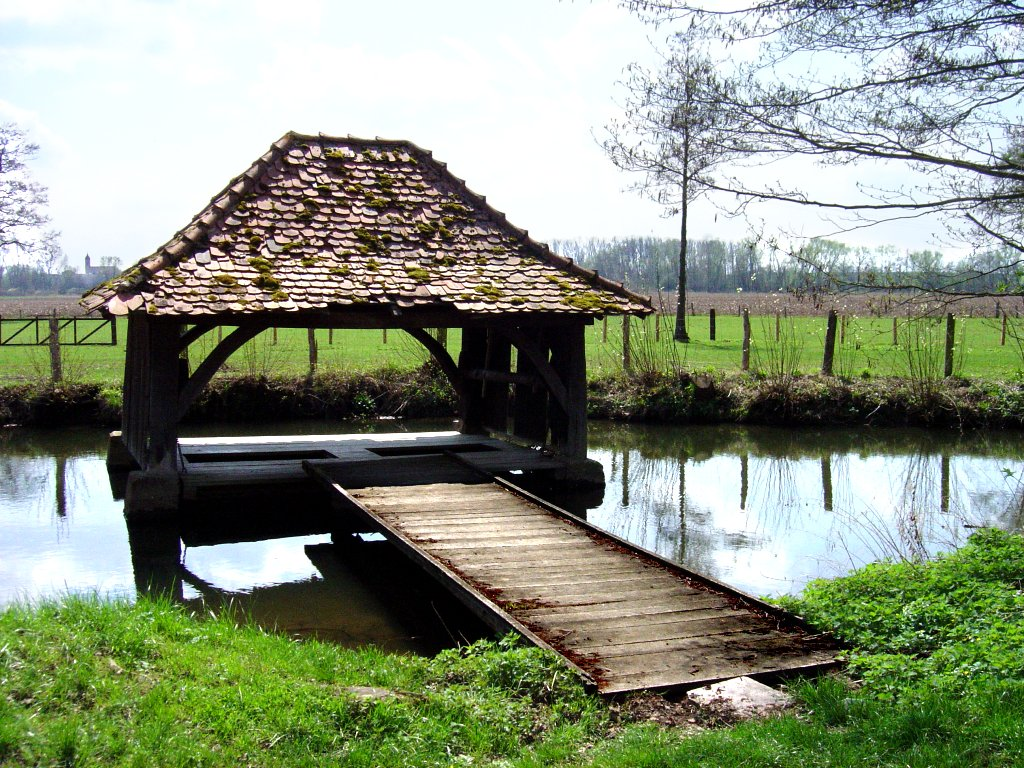
Lavoir at Gunstett

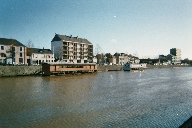
Laundry boat at Laval

Laundry boat in Haute-Garonne, 1901

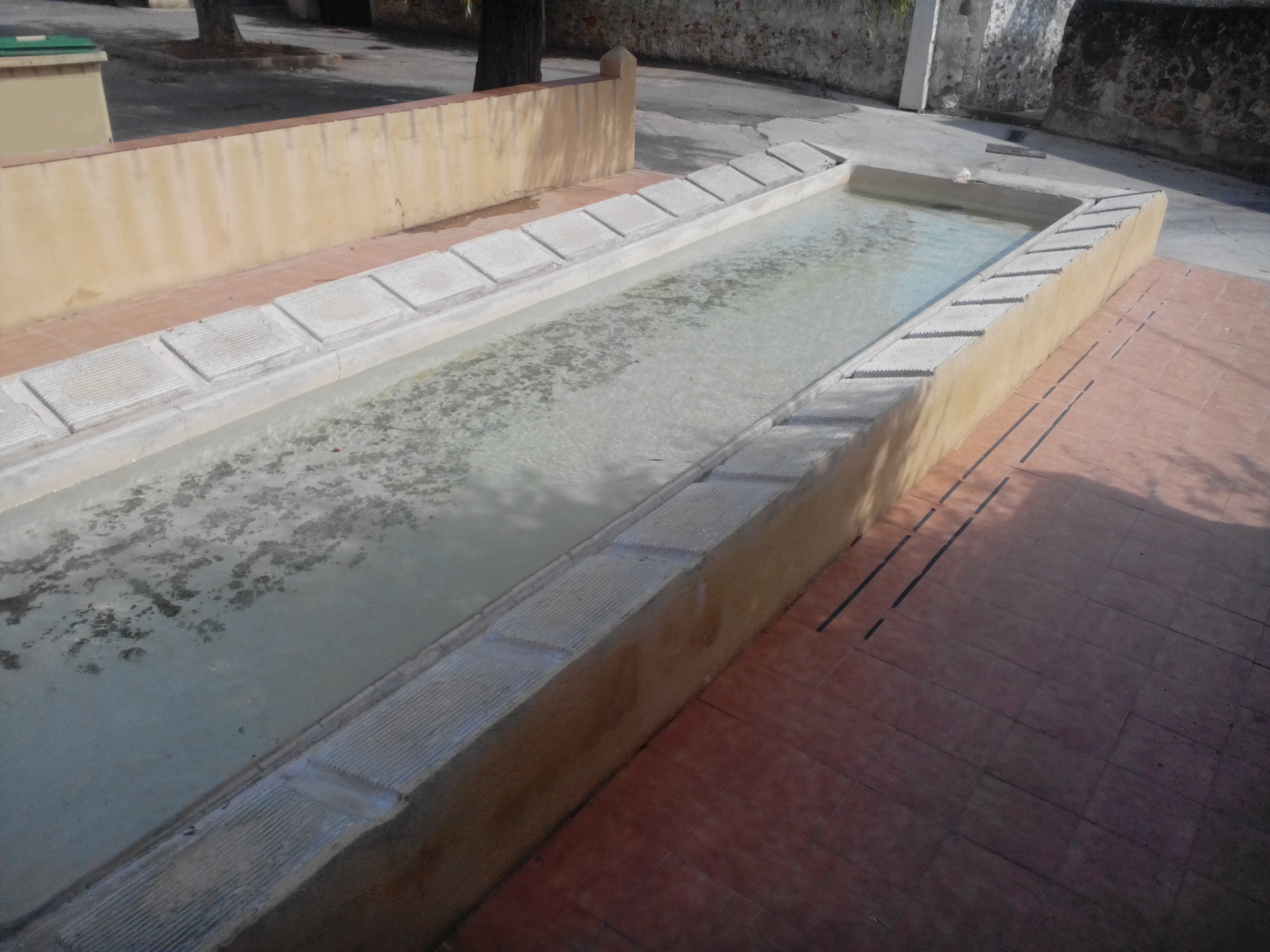
Lavadero público in Spain about 1874 at Vellisca in the Province of Cuenca

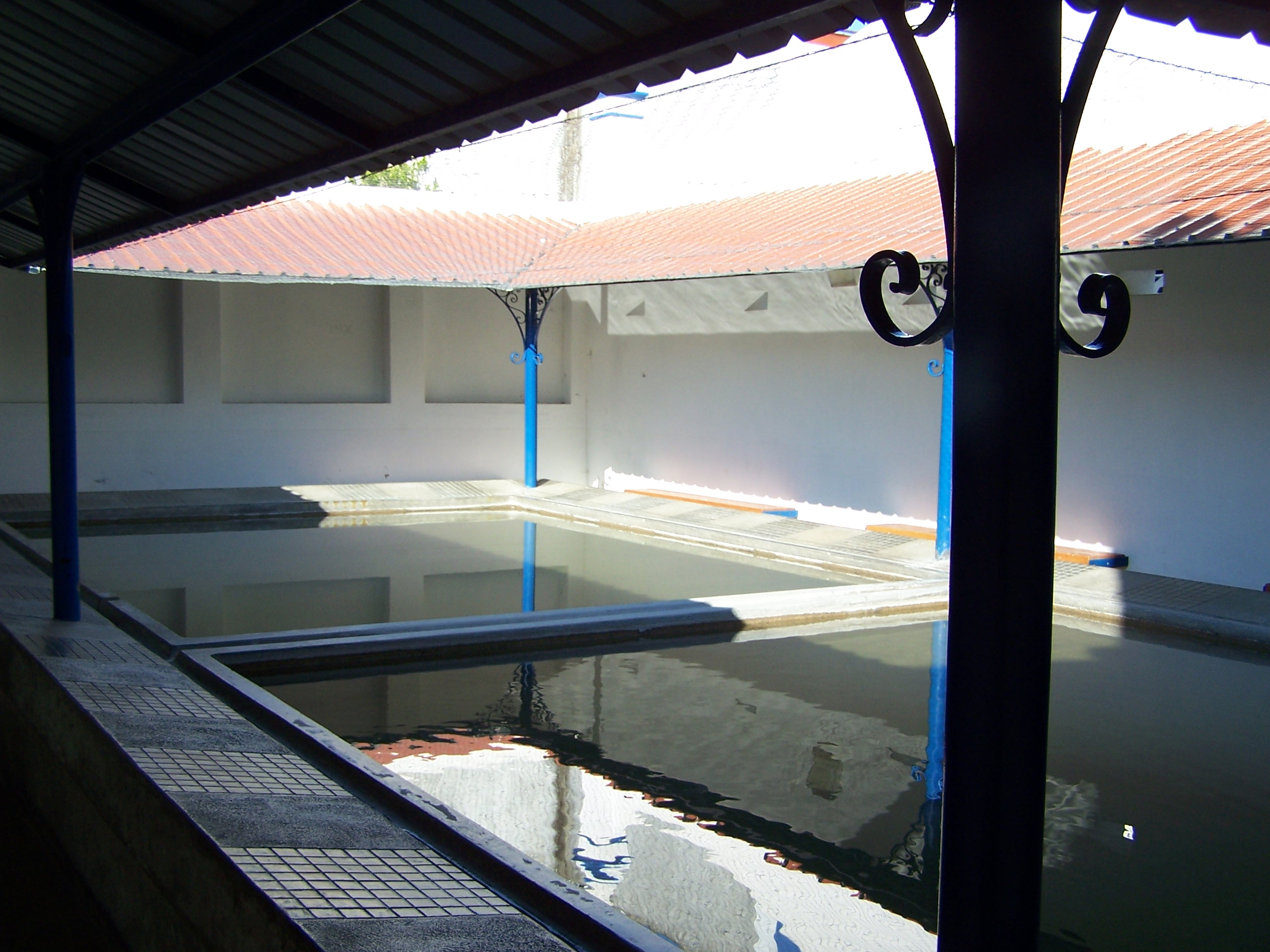
Public wash-pool at Cabeção, Portugal

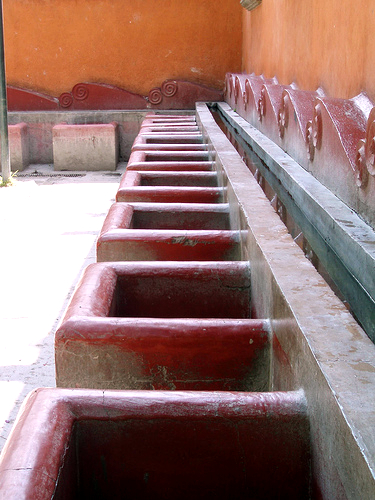
Public washbasins at San Miguel de Allende, Mexico

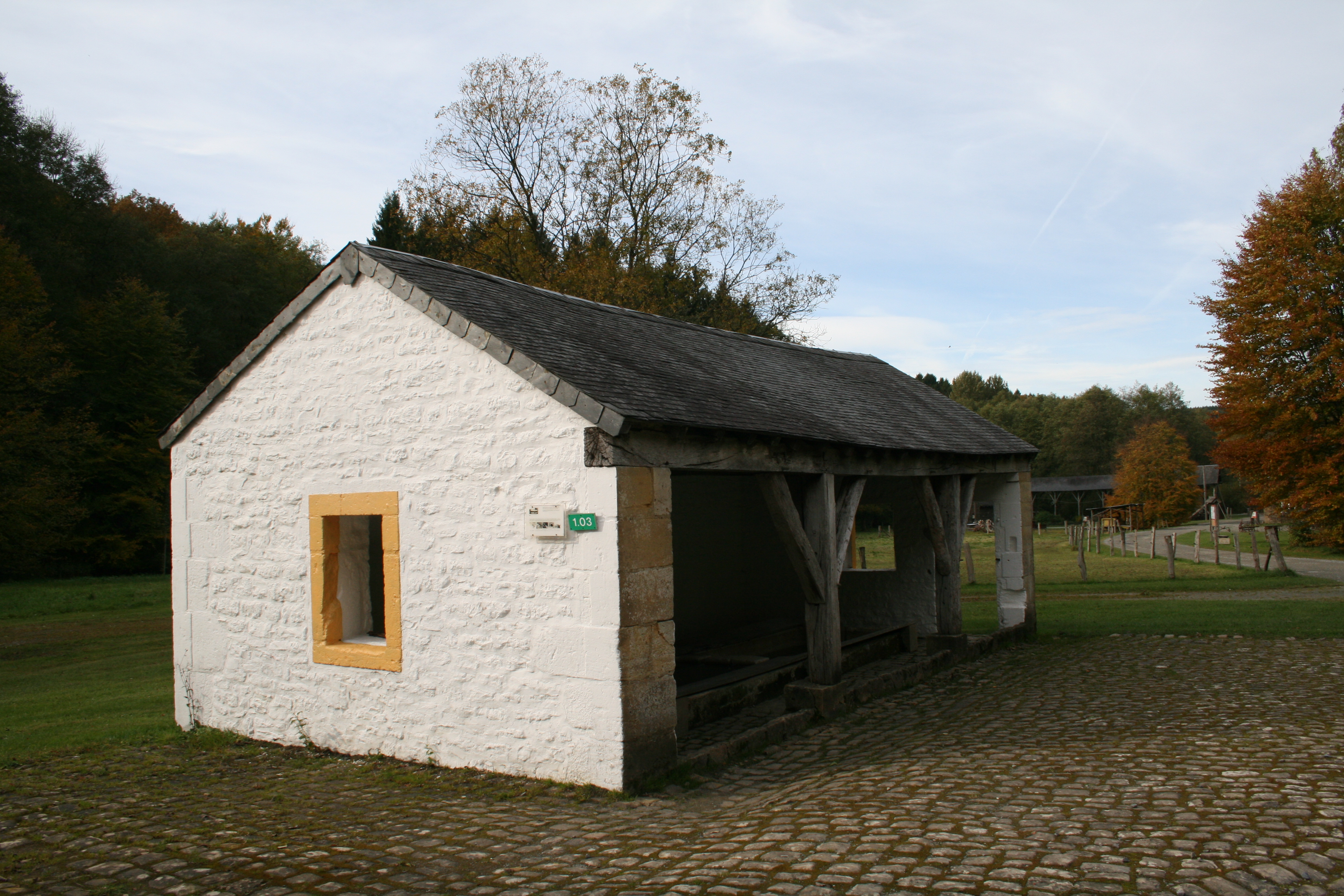
Fourneau Saint-Michel - Lavoir (Saint-Rémy)

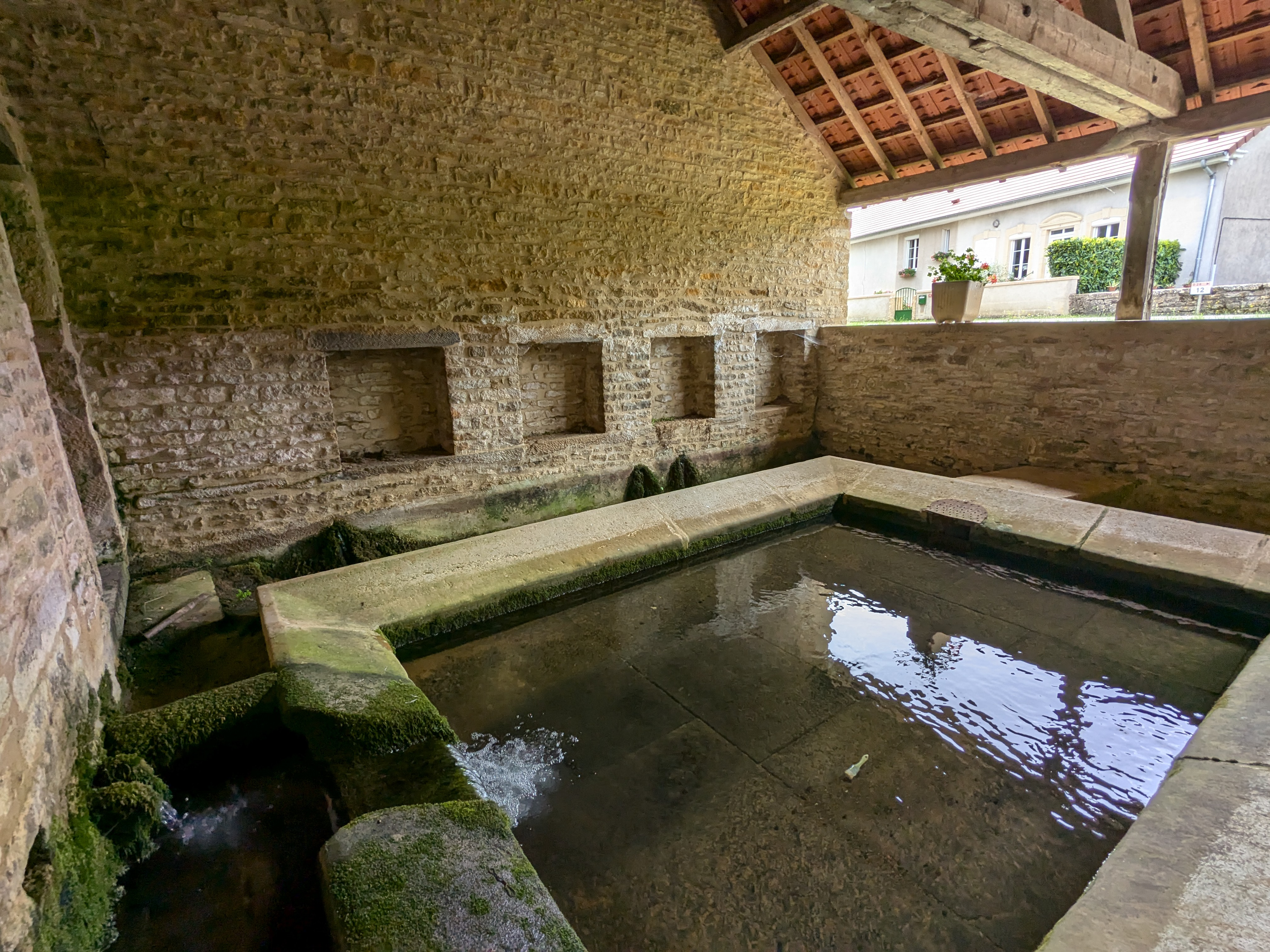
The lavoir in Le Puley

== See also ==
- Baths and wash houses in Britain
- Bleachfield
- Dhobi Ghat, an outdoor laundry place in South Asia
- Laundry#Washhouses
