= Ervy-le-Châtel =

Commune in Grand Est, France

- Commune
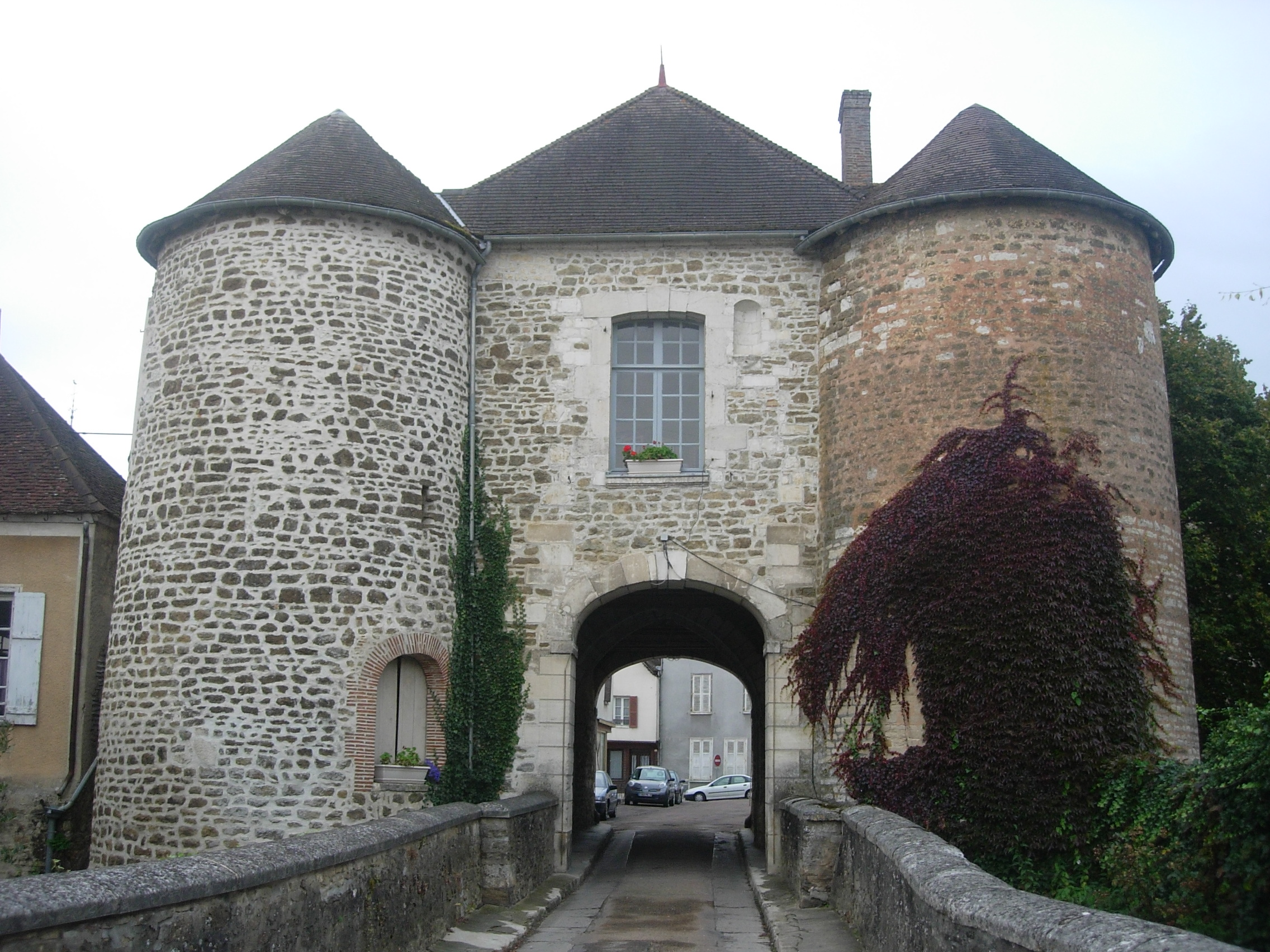
- Saint Nicolas gate

- Coat of arms
- Location of Ervy-le-Châtel
- Location within France Location within Grand Est
- Coordinates: 48°02′30″N 3°54′43″E
- Country: France
- Region: Grand Est
- Department: Aube
- Arrondissement: Troyes
- Canton: Aix-Villemaur-Pâlis

Government
  - Mayor (2020–2026): Roger Bataille
- Area^{1}: 21.39 km^{2} (8.26 sq mi)
- Elevation: 161 m (528 ft)
- Population (2023): 1,099
  - Density: 51.38/km^{2} (133.1/sq mi)
- Time zone: UTC+01:00 (CET)
  - Summer (DST): UTC+02:00 (CEST)
- INSEE/Postal code: 10140 /10130
- ^{1} French Land Register data, which excludes lakes, ponds, glaciers > 1 km^{2} (0.386 sq mi or 247 acres) and river estuaries.

Ervy-le-Châtel (French pronunciation: [ɛʁvi lə ʃɑtɛl]) is a commune in the Aube department in north-east France.

== Population ==
Historical population
Year	Pop.	±% p.a.
1968	1,175	—
1975	1,198	+0.28%
1982	1,262	+0.75%
1990	1,221	−0.41%
1999	1,214	−0.06%
2007	1,191	−0.24%
2012	1,226	+0.58%
2017	1,193	−0.54%
2023	1,099	−1.36%
Source: INSEE

== Sights ==
- Arboretum Saint-Antoine
- Round hall
- Porte Saint-Nicolas

== See also ==
- Communes of the Aube department
