= Dhobi Ghat Park, Faisalabad =

Park in Faisalabad, Pakistan

Iqbal Park, Faisalabad
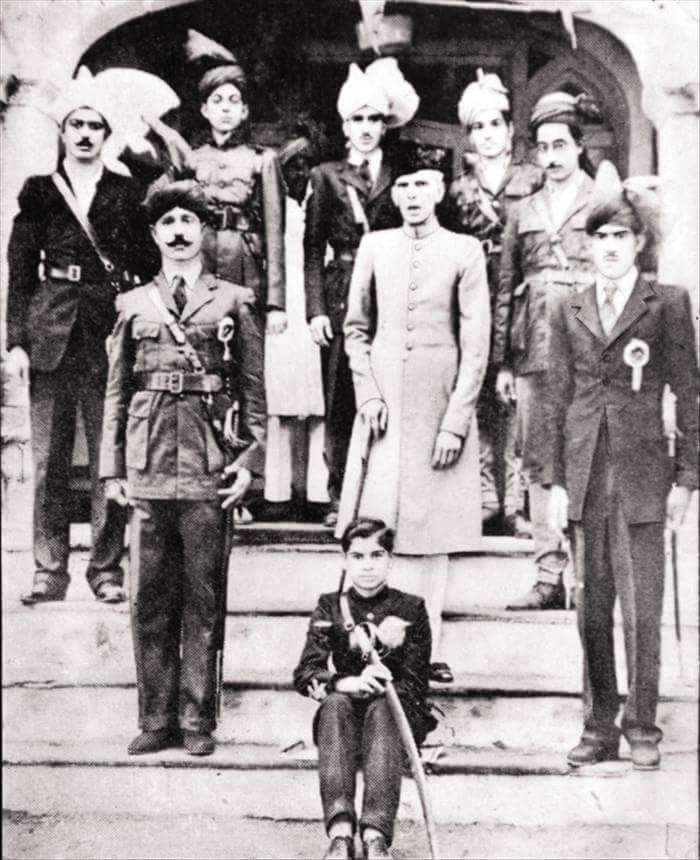
- Mohammed Ali Jinnah, in Lyallpur (now called Faisalabad), where he gave a historic speech at Dhobi Ghat Grounds, c. 1943
- Location: Centrally located in the city of Faisalabad, near Bhawana Bazaar
- Other information: Dhobi Ghat Grounds (former name)

Dhobi Ghat Park, Faisalabad (Punjabi/Urdu: دھوبی گھاٹ پارک), officially known as Iqbal Park, Faisalabad, is a public park situated in the center of Faisalabad, near the main bus station at Narwala Road and Bhawana Bazaar.

== History ==
Dhobi Ghat Grounds was renamed as 'Iqbal Park', Faisalabad later but the name Dhobi Ghat is still very much in use among the common people in this city. The Government of Punjab, Pakistan website uses both names – Dhobi Gat Grounds or Iqbal Park for this location.

Quaide-e-Azam Muhammad Ali Jinnah was invited to address a very large gathering of an estimated 2 million people at Dhobi Ghat Grounds as part of a campaign for Pakistan Movement in 1943. Dhobi Ghat Grounds, Faisalabad are known to have historical significance due to many other Pakistani political leaders, following Jinnah's tradition, later choosing to use it for political gatherings.
