= Vellisca =

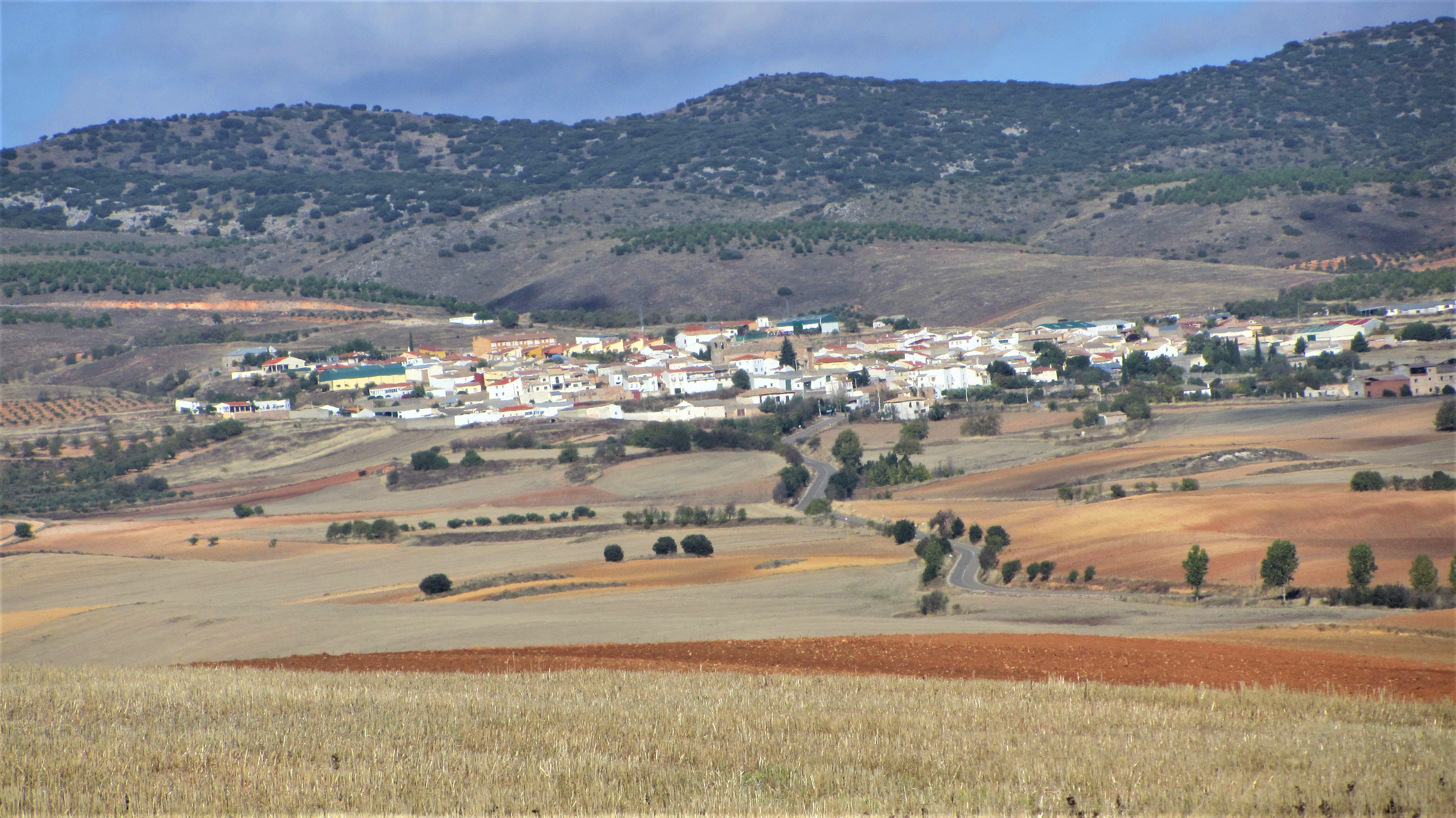
- Panoramic of Vellisca

- Flag Coat of arms

- Location within Spain Location within Castilla-La Mancha
- Coordinates: 40°07′46″N 2°48′51″W
- Country: Spain
- Autonomous community: Castile-La Mancha
- Province: Cuenca
- Municipality: Vellisca

Government
  - Mayor: Teodora Moreno Yunta

Area
  - Total: 42 km^{2} (16 sq mi)
- Elevation: 932 m (3,058 ft)

Population (2025-01-01)
  - Total: 128
  - Density: 3.0/km^{2} (7.9/sq mi)
- Time zone: UTC+1 (CET)
  - Summer (DST): UTC+2 (CEST)
- Website: Vellisca

Vellisca is a municipality located in the province of Cuenca, Castile-La Mancha, Spain. According to the 2004 census (INE), the municipality has a population of 161 inhabitants.
