= Ghat (disambiguation) =

Ghat may refer to:

- Ghat, a stairway leading up from a river in South Asia
- Burning ghat, a level area atop a riverbank ghat where Hindus cremate their dead
- Ghat, Libya, a town in Libya
- Ghāṭ, a term used in Assamese Vaishnava-Sattriya music for tabla or pakhawaj compositions
- Ghats, literally meaning slope mountains, the two mountain ranges of peninsular India which run parallel to the coastline are:
  - Eastern Ghats, a mountain range along India's eastern coast
  - Western Ghats, a mountain range along India's western coast
  - Ghat Roads, roads through such mountains
- Ghat (Armenian letter)

== See also ==
- Ghaut (disambiguation)
- Ghara (disambiguation)
