= Dhoby Ghaut =

- Subzone of Museum Planning Area

Name transcription(s)
  - Chinese: 多美歌
  - Pinyin: Duōměigē
  - Malay: Dhoby Ghaut
  - Tamil: தோபி காட்
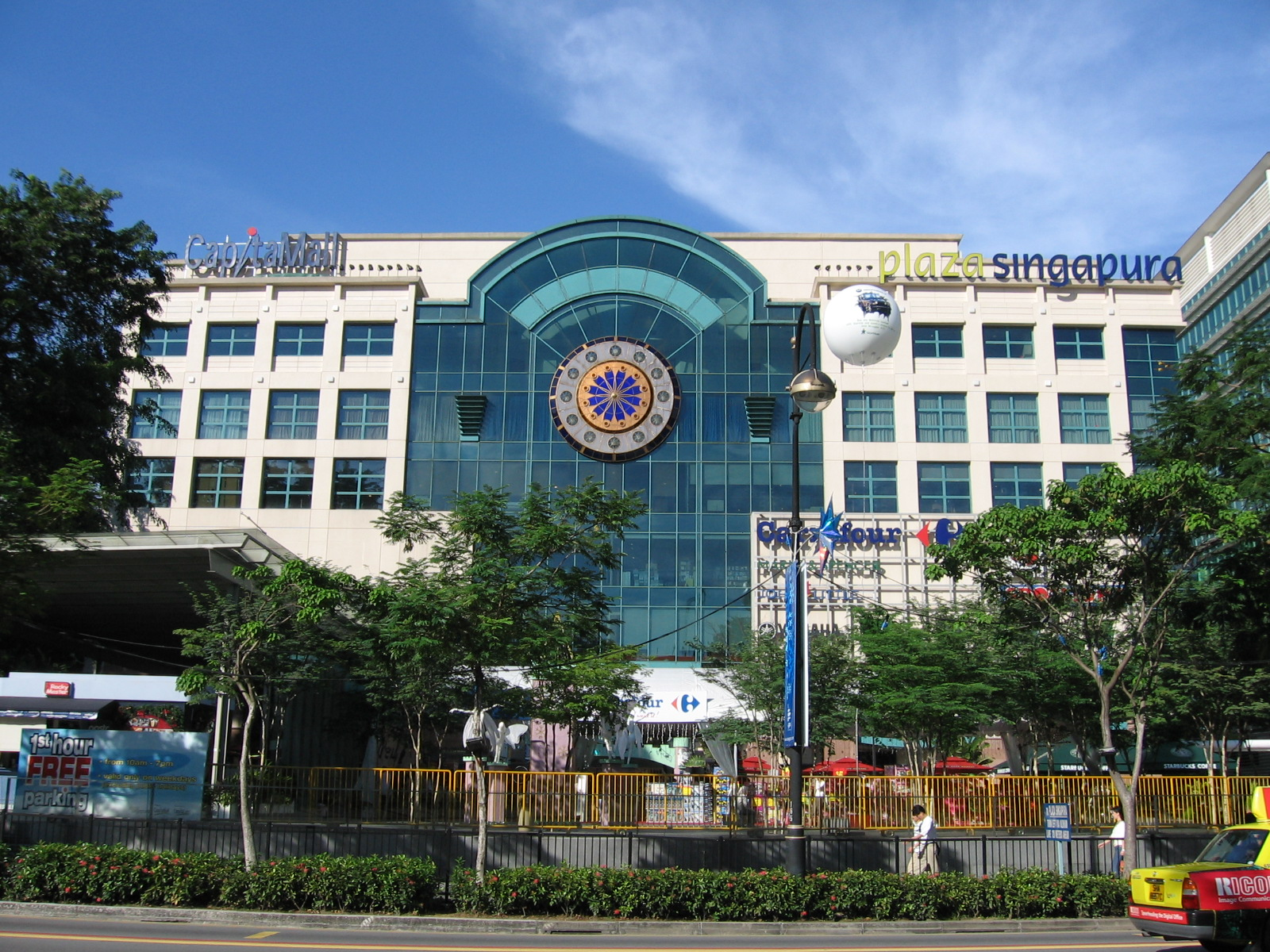
- Plaza Singapura, a mall in Dhoby Ghaut before refurbishment

- Location of Dhoby Ghaut within Singapore
- Coordinates: 1°17′54″N 103°50′46″E
- Country: Singapore

Area
  - Total: 0.2220 km^{2} (0.0857 sq mi)

Population (2020)
  - Total: 320
  - Density: 1,400/km^{2} (3,700/sq mi)

Dhoby Ghaut (IPA: /ˌdoʊbi ˈɡɔːt/ DOH-bee GAWT) is a place in Singapore that often refers to the MRT station of the same name, which is a major interchange station on Singapore's Mass Rapid Transit network connecting the North-South Line, North East Line, and the Circle Line. As a place, Dhoby Ghaut lies along the eastern end of Orchard Road. There is a shopping mall above the MRT station called Plaza Singapura.

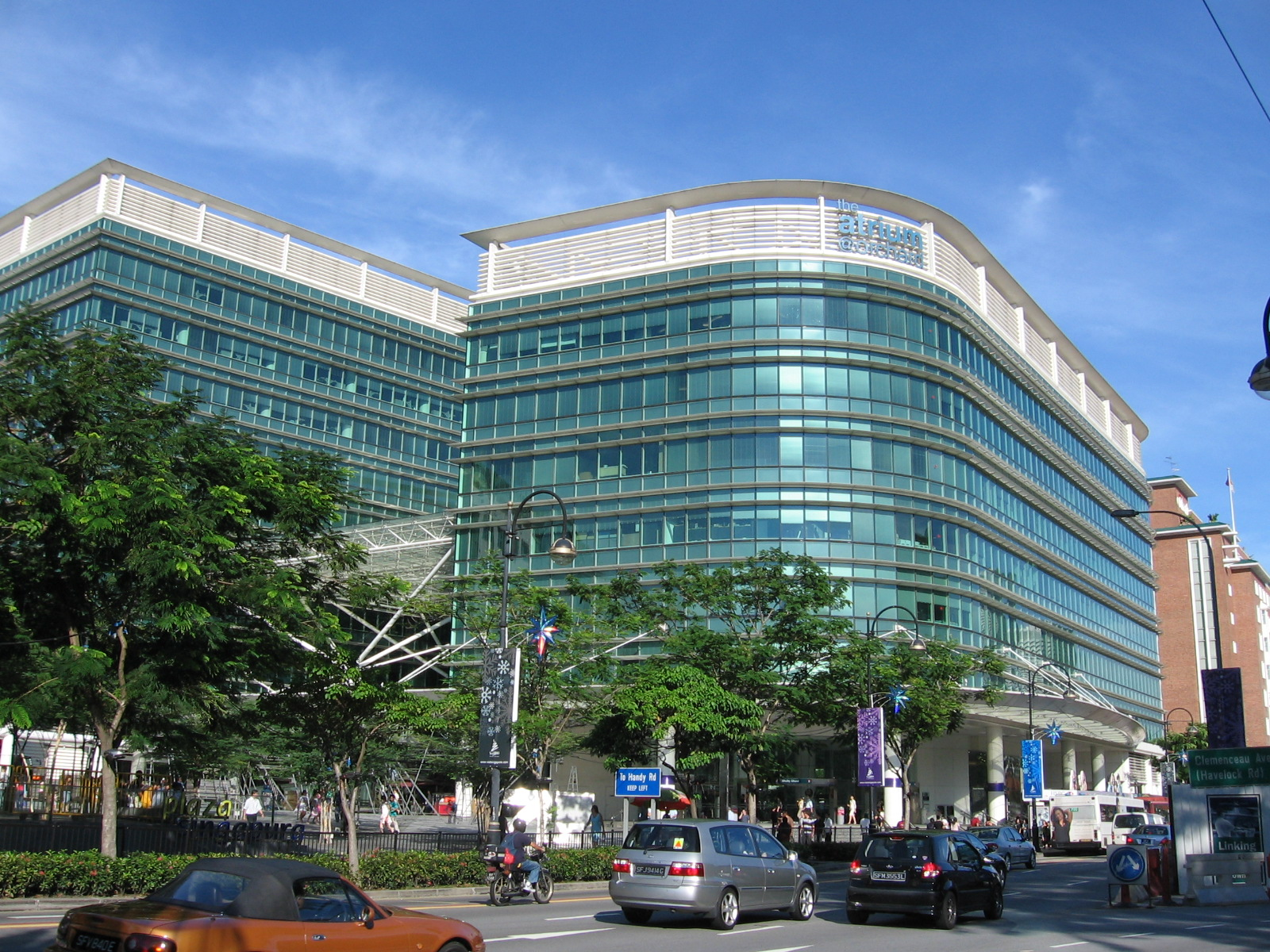
The Atrium@Orchard is a retail and office development, comprising two office blocks and retail space on the ground floor, located just above the Dhoby Ghaut MRT station.

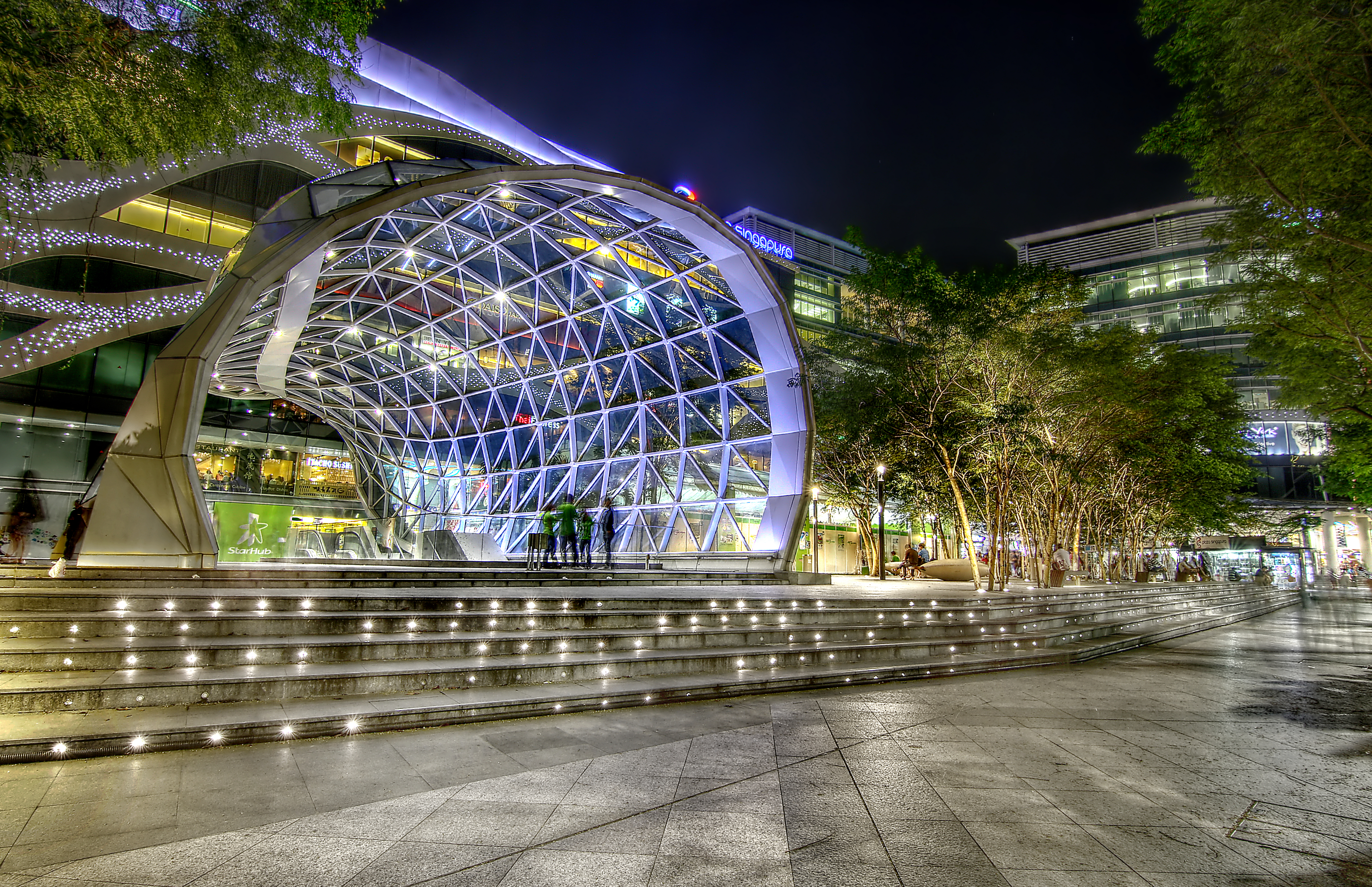
Plaza Singapura.

== Etymology ==
Dhoby Ghaut was influenced from Dhobi Ghat, which literally means washerman's place in Hindi, from dhobi, "washerman" or one that does laundry, and ghat, referring to a series of steps leading down to a body of water, as in the case of the Varanasi ghats by the Ganges. The Hindi term ghat passed into English usage during the British occupation of India, and was later anglicised to ghaut.

Around this time, the British had also ruled Singapore, which influenced the naming of this area.

== Early history ==
Until the early 1900s, the dhobis used water from a clear stream that flowed into Sungai Bras Basah, now Stamford Canal. This stream now exists as a large drain beside Handy Road. The ghats, or steps leading down to the stream, were demolished when Sungai Bras Basah was canalised. The dhobis would then dry the laundry at Dhoby Green, the open park bounded by Stamford Road, Handy Road, Bras Basah Road and Prinsep Street.

== See also ==
- Dhoby Ghaut, Penang, Malaysia
- Dhobi Ghat, Mumbai, India
