= Dhoby Ghaut, Penang =

Coordinates: 5°24′48.3″N 100°18′33.9″E

Dhoby Ghaut
- Quarter
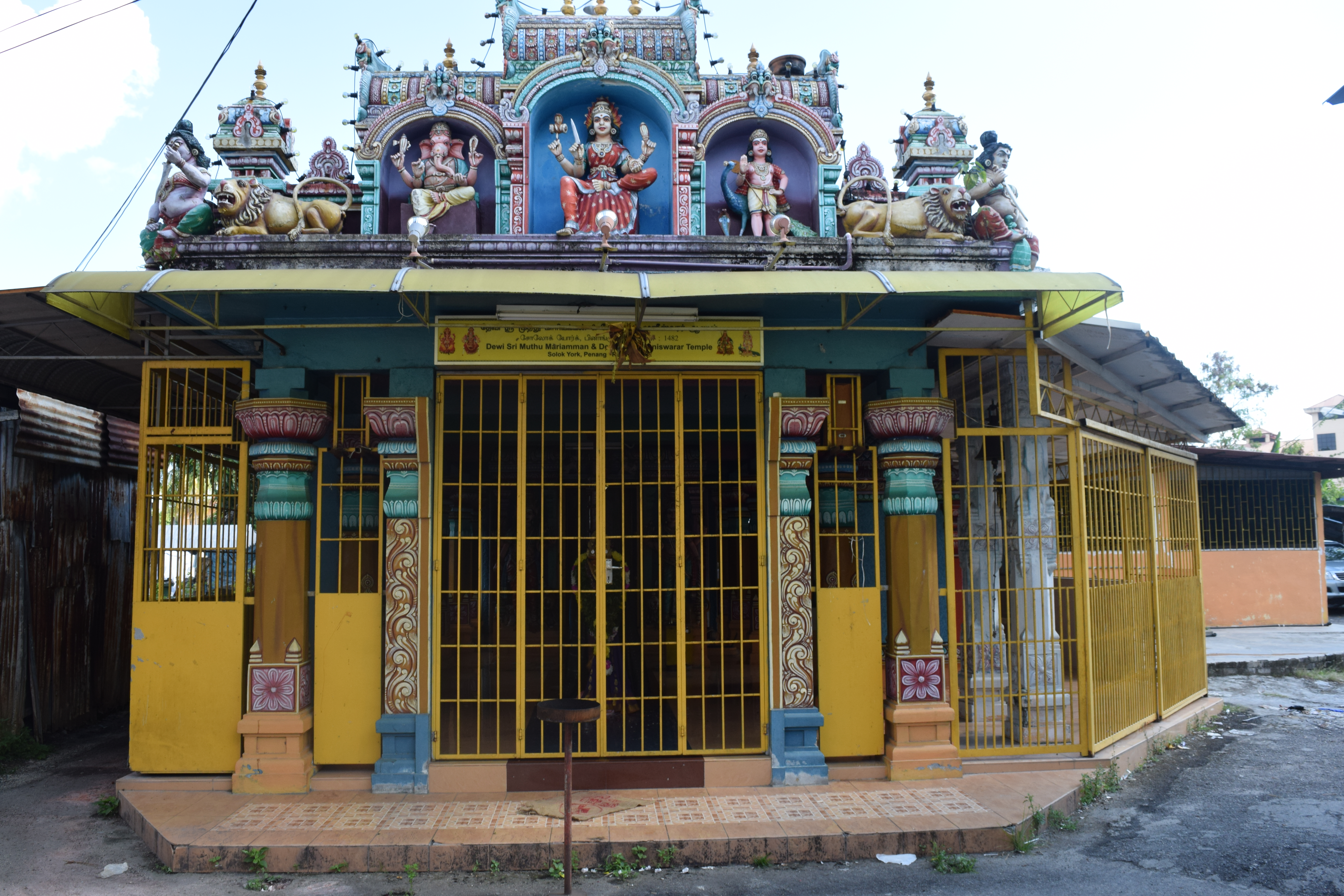
- Naduthurai Sri Devi Karumariamman Temple in Dhoby Ghaut
- Interactive map of Dhoby Ghaut

Government
  - Local government: Penang Island City Council
  - Mayor of Penang Island: Rajendran P. Anthony
- Time zone: UTC+8 (MST)

Dhoby Ghaut is located within the city of George Town in the Malaysian state of Penang. It also known as Vannan Thora Tedal ('laundry district') among the local Indian community.

== Location ==
Dhobby Ghaut is located between Jalan Air Hitam and York Road. It lies at the confluence of Sungai Air Itam and Sungai Air Terjun, from where Sungai Pinang emerges. A few laundries still operate there. Many people who live there work in the traditional Indian laundry service providers who have been operating there generations after generations.

== Etymology ==
Dhoby Ghaut or Dhobī Ghāṭ (Hindi: धोबी घाट, Punjabi: ਧੋਬੀ ਘਾਟ, Tamil: தோபி காட்) literally means "washing place" in Hindi, from dhobī "washerman" or one that does laundry, and ghāṭ, generically meaning a large open space.

== Temples ==
This place hosts two Hindu temples, Naduthurai Sri Devi Karumariamman and Sri Rama Temple. These temples were built by dhobies.

== See also ==
- Dhoby Ghaut, Singapore
- Dhobi Ghat, Mumbai, India
