= Washing machine =

Machine that washes clothes

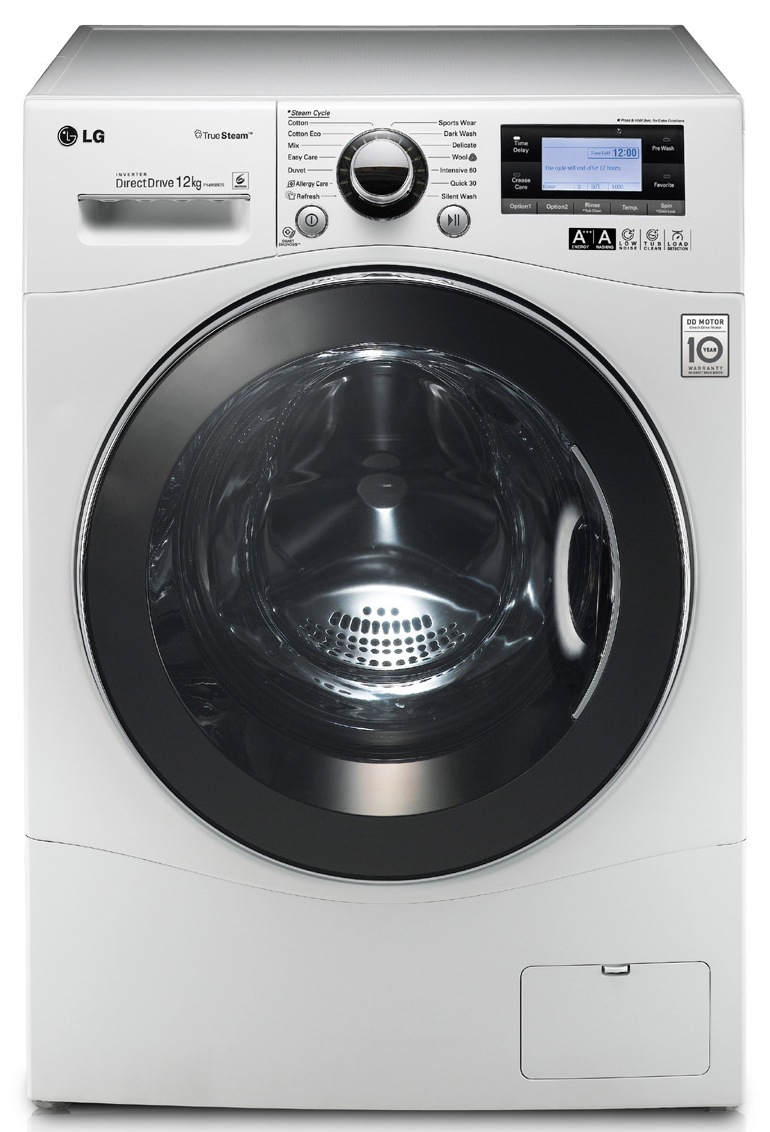
LG washing machine (c. 2010)

A washing machine (laundry machine, clothes washer, or washer) is a machine designed to launder clothing. The term is mostly applied to machines that use water. Other ways of doing laundry include dry cleaning (which uses alternative cleaning fluids and is performed by specialist businesses) and ultrasonic cleaning.

Modern-day home appliances use electric power to automatically clean clothes. The user adds laundry detergent, which is sold in liquid, powder, or dehydrated sheet form, to the wash water. The machines are also found in commercial laundromats where customers pay-per-use.

Before the invention of washing machines and indoor plumbing, clothes had to be washed by hand in a multi-step process that often occupied an entire day of work, plus drying and ironing. The first English patent under the category of washing machines was issued in 1691. Electric washing machines were advertised and discussed in newspapers as early as 1904, and the first automatic washing machine was introduced in 1937. The spread of the washing machine has been seen to be a force behind the improvement of women's position in society, and has been compared to the contraceptive pill, abortion rights, and the refrigerator. Irish feminist Mary Frances McDonald has described washing machines as the single most life-changing invention for women, and Swedish statistician Hans Rosling suggested that its positive impact makes it "the greatest invention of the Industrial Revolution".

== History ==
=== Washing by hand ===
An early Miele washing machine at the Roscheider Hof Open Air Museum, Germany, showing farming traditions of the Irrel region

Laundering by hand involves soaking, beating, scrubbing, and rinsing dirty textiles. Before indoor plumbing, it was necessary to carry all the water used for washing, boiling, and rinsing the laundry from a pump, well, or spring. Water for the laundry would be carried, heated on a fire for washing, and then poured into a tub. This meant the amount of warm, soapy water was limited; it would be reused to wash the least soiled clothing, then to wash progressively dirtier laundry.

Removal of soap and water from the clothing after washing was a separate process. First, soap would be rinsed out with clear water. After rinsing, the soaking wet clothing would be formed into a roll and twisted by hand to extract water. The entire process often occupied an entire day of work, plus drying and ironing.

=== Early machines ===
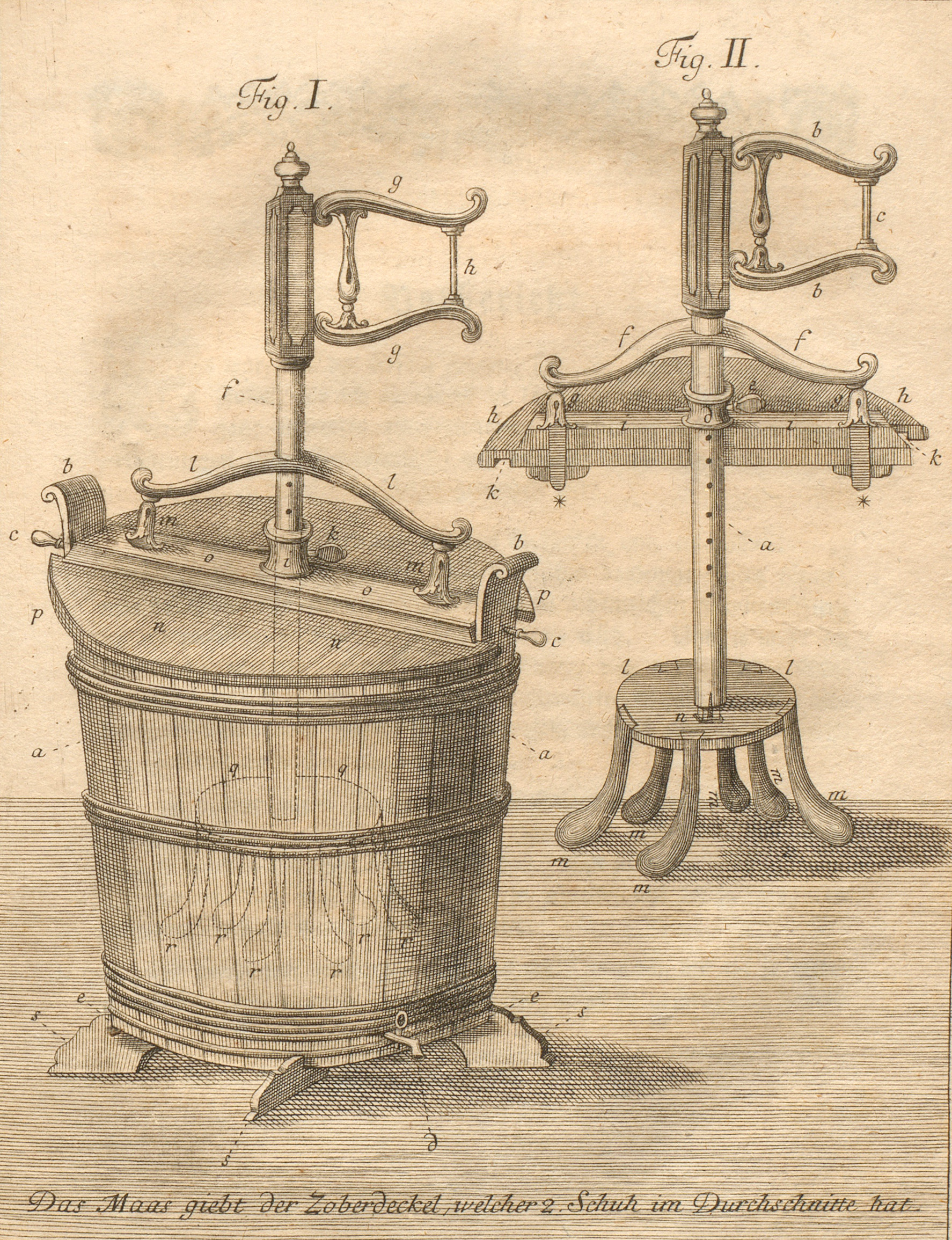
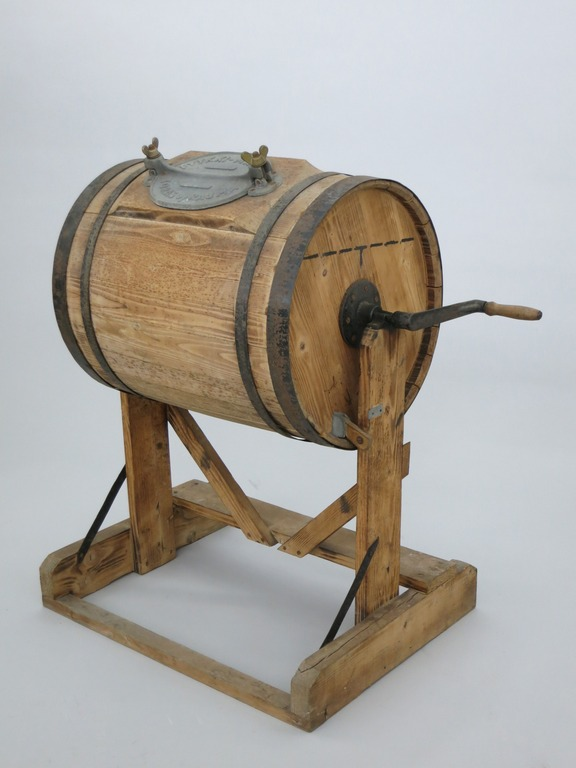
A 1766 illustration of Schäffer's washing machine (left) and a simple, crank-operated washing machine (right)

Wringer washer, Paspébiac, Québec, Canada

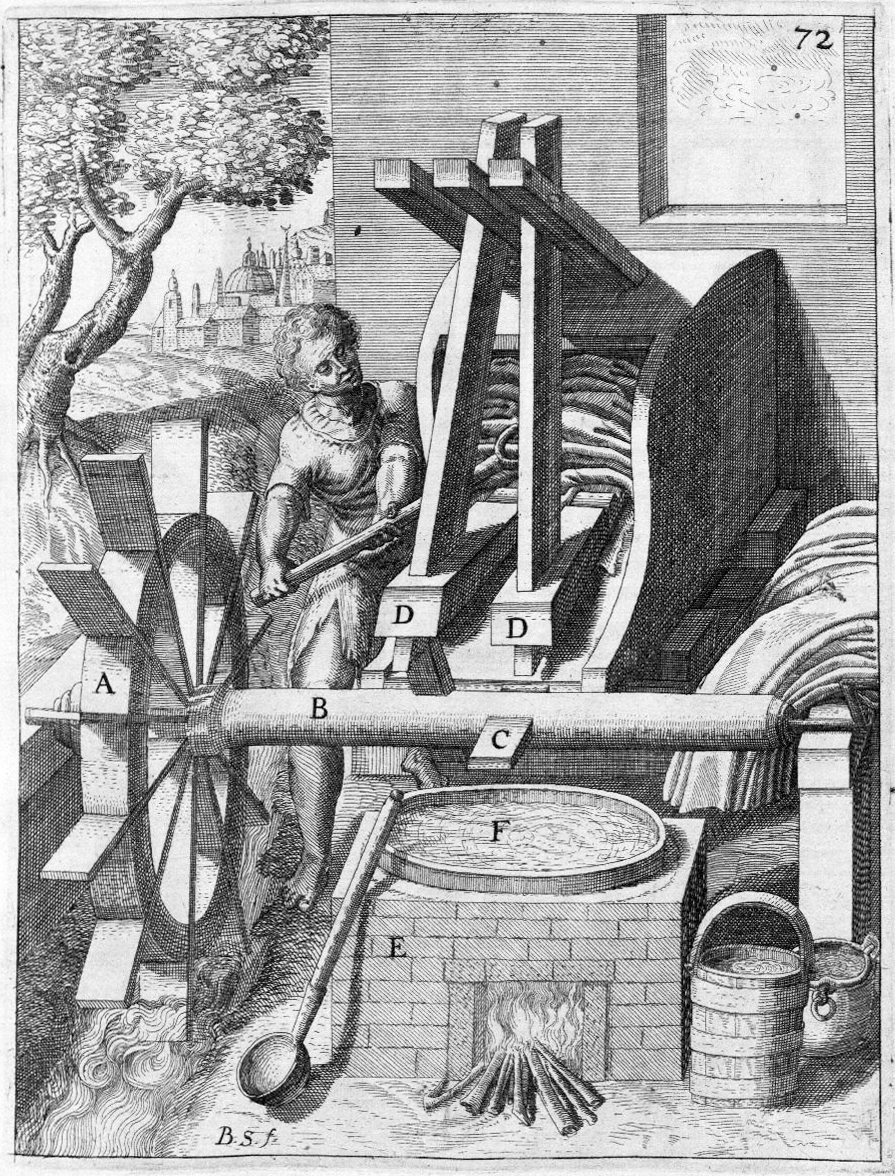
A fulling mill from Georg Andreas Böckler's Theatrum Machinarum Novum, 1661

An early example of washing by machine is the practice of fulling. In a fulling mill, the cloth was beaten with wooden hammers, known as fulling stocks or fulling hammers.

The first English patent under the category of washing machines was issued in 1691. A drawing of an early washing machine appeared in the January 1752 issue of The Gentleman's Magazine, a British publication. Jacob Christian Schäffer's washing machine design was published in 1767 in Germany. In 1782, Henry Sidgier was issued a British patent for a rotating drum washer, and in the 1790s, Edward Beetham sold numerous "patent washing mills" in England.

One of the first innovations in washing machine technology was the use of enclosed containers or basins that had grooves, fingers, or paddles to help with the scrubbing and rubbing of the clothes. The person using the washer would use a stick to press and rotate the clothes along the textured sides of the basin or container, agitating the clothes to remove dirt and mud. This crude agitator technology was hand-powered, but still more effective than actually hand-washing the clothes.

More advancements were made to washing machine technology in the form of the rotating drum design. These early design patents consisted of a drum washer that was hand-cranked to make the wooden drums rotate. While the technology was simple enough, it was a milestone in the history of washing machines, as it introduced the idea of "powered" washing drums. As metal drums started to replace the traditional wooden drums, it allowed for the drum to turn above an open fire or an enclosed fire chamber, raising the water temperature for more effective washes.

It was in the nineteenth century that steam power was first used in washing machine designs, and there was something of race to develop labor-saving washing machines.

In 1862, a patented "compound rotary washing machine, with rollers for wringing or mangling" by Richard Lansdale of Pendleton, Manchester, was shown at the 1862 London Exhibition.

The first United States Patent, titled "Clothes Washing", was granted to Nathaniel Briggs of New Hampshire in 1797. Because of the Patent Office fire in 1836, no description of the device survives. The invention of the washing machine is also attributed to Watervliet Shaker Village, as a patent was issued to an Amos Larcom of Watervliet, New York, in 1829. A device that combined a washing machine with a wringer mechanism appeared in 1843 when Canadian John E. Turnbull of Saint John, New Brunswick patented a "Clothes Washer With Wringer Rolls". During the 1850s, Nicholas Bennett of the Mount Lebanon Shaker Society at New Lebanon, New York, invented a "wash mill", but in 1858 he assigned the patent to David Parker of the Canterbury Shaker Village, where it was registered as the "Improved Washing Machine".

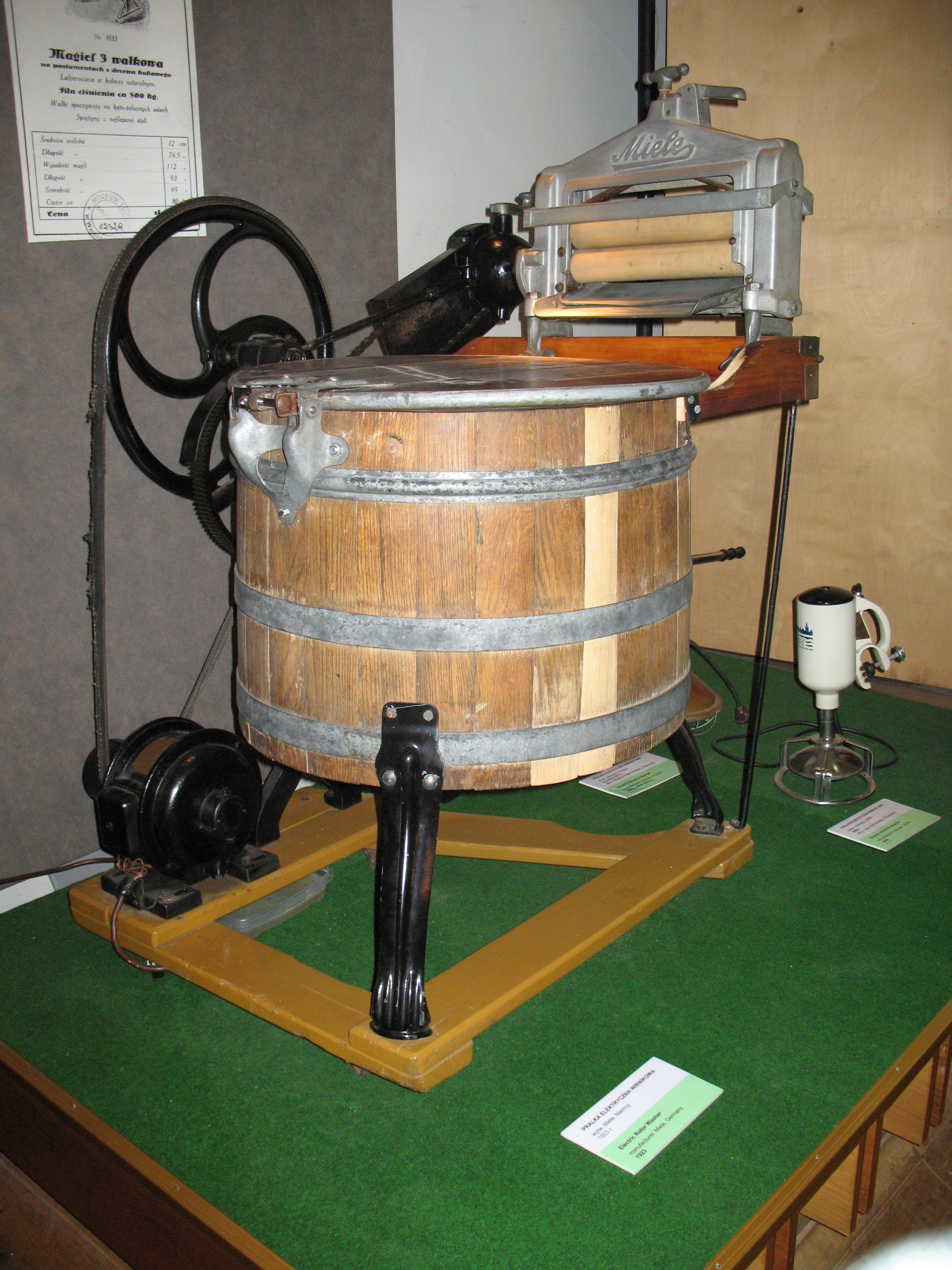
A 1923 electric Miele washing machine with a built-in mangle for drying

Margaret Colvin improved the Triumph Rotary Washer, which was exhibited in the Women's Pavilion at the Centennial International Exhibition of 1876 in Philadelphia. At the same exhibition, the Shakers won a gold medal for their machine.

Electric washing machines were advertised and discussed in newspapers as early as 1904. Alva J. Fisher has been incorrectly credited with the invention of the electric washer. The US Patent Office shows at least one patent issued before Fisher's US patent number 966677 (e.g. Woodrow's US patent number 921195). The first inventor of the electric washing machine remains unknown.

US electric washing machine sales reached 800,000 units in 1928. However, high unemployment rates in the Depression years reduced sales; by 1932 the number of units shipped was down to about 600,000.

England established public washrooms for laundry along with bathhouses throughout the nineteenth century. The term "laundromat" can be found in newspapers as early as 1884, and they were widespread by the time of the Depression. Patrons used coin-in-the-slot facilities to rent washing machines.

Washer design improved during the 1930s. The mechanism was now enclosed within a cabinet, and more attention was paid to electrical and mechanical safety. Spin dryers were introduced to replace the dangerous power mangle/wringers of the day.

By 1940, 60% of the 25,000,000 electrically wired homes in the United States had an electric washing machine. Many of these machines featured a power wringer, although built-in spin dryers were not uncommon.

=== Automatic machines ===
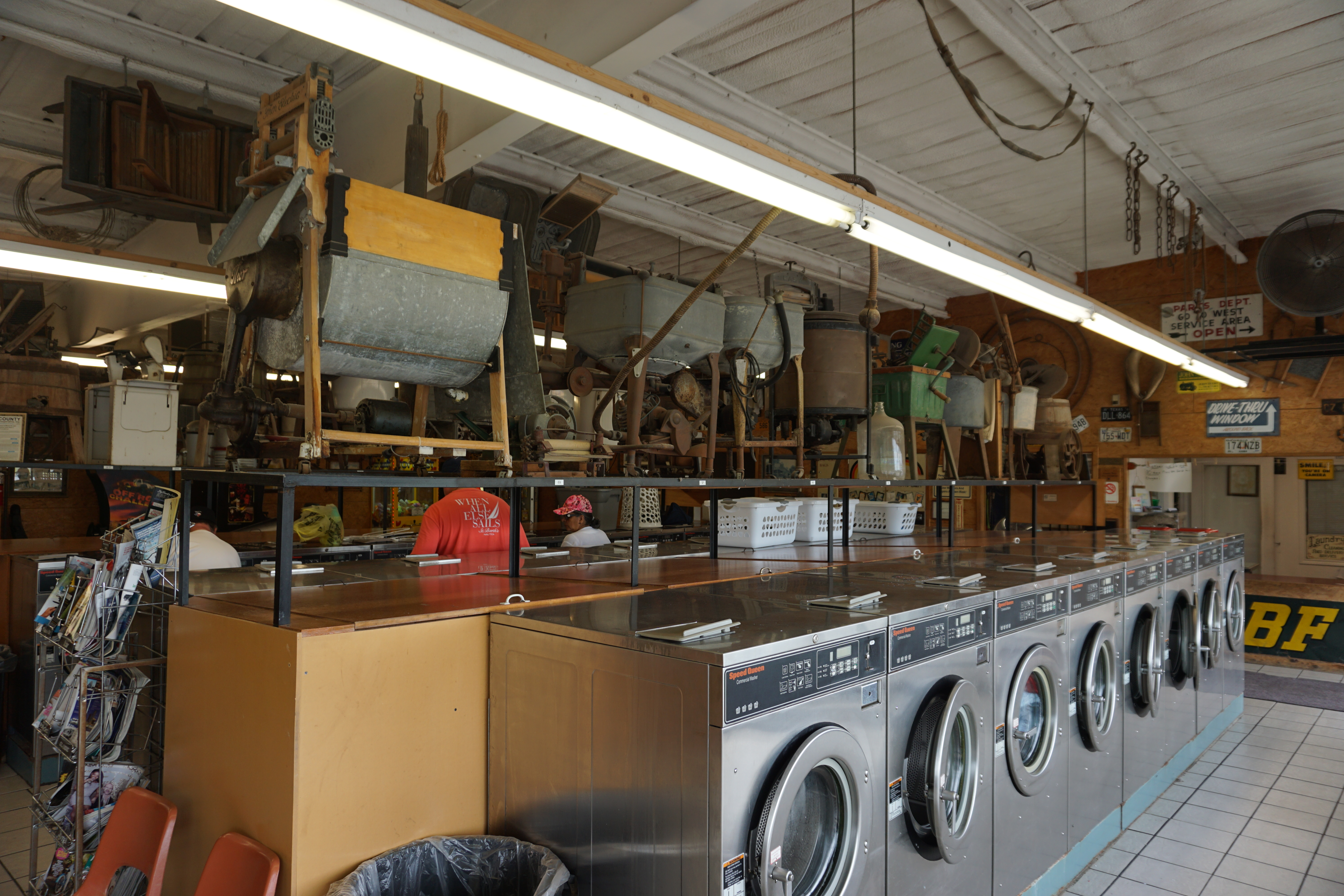
The Washing Machine Museum in Mineral Wells, Texas

Bendix Home Appliances, a subsidiary of Avco, introduced the first domestic automatic washing machine in 1937, having applied for a patent in the same year. Avco had licensed the name from Bendix Corporation, an otherwise unrelated company. This first machine resembled modern front-loading automatic washers in both appearance and mechanical design.

Although it included many of today's basic features, the machine lacked any drum suspension and therefore had to be anchored to the floor to prevent "walking". Because of the components required, the machine was also expensive. For instance, the Bendix Home Laundry Service Manual (published November 1, 1946) shows that the drum speed change was facilitated by a two-speed gearbox built to a heavy-duty standard, like a smaller version of a car's automatic gearbox. The miniature electric motors used in the timers were also expensive to produce.

Early automatic washing machines were usually connected to a water supply via temporary slip-on connectors to sink taps. Later, permanent connections to hot and cold water became the norm. Most modern front-loading European machines now only have a cold water connection (called "cold fill") and rely completely on internal electric heaters to raise the water temperature.

Many of the early automatic machines had coin-in-the-slot facilities and were installed in the basement laundry rooms of apartment houses.

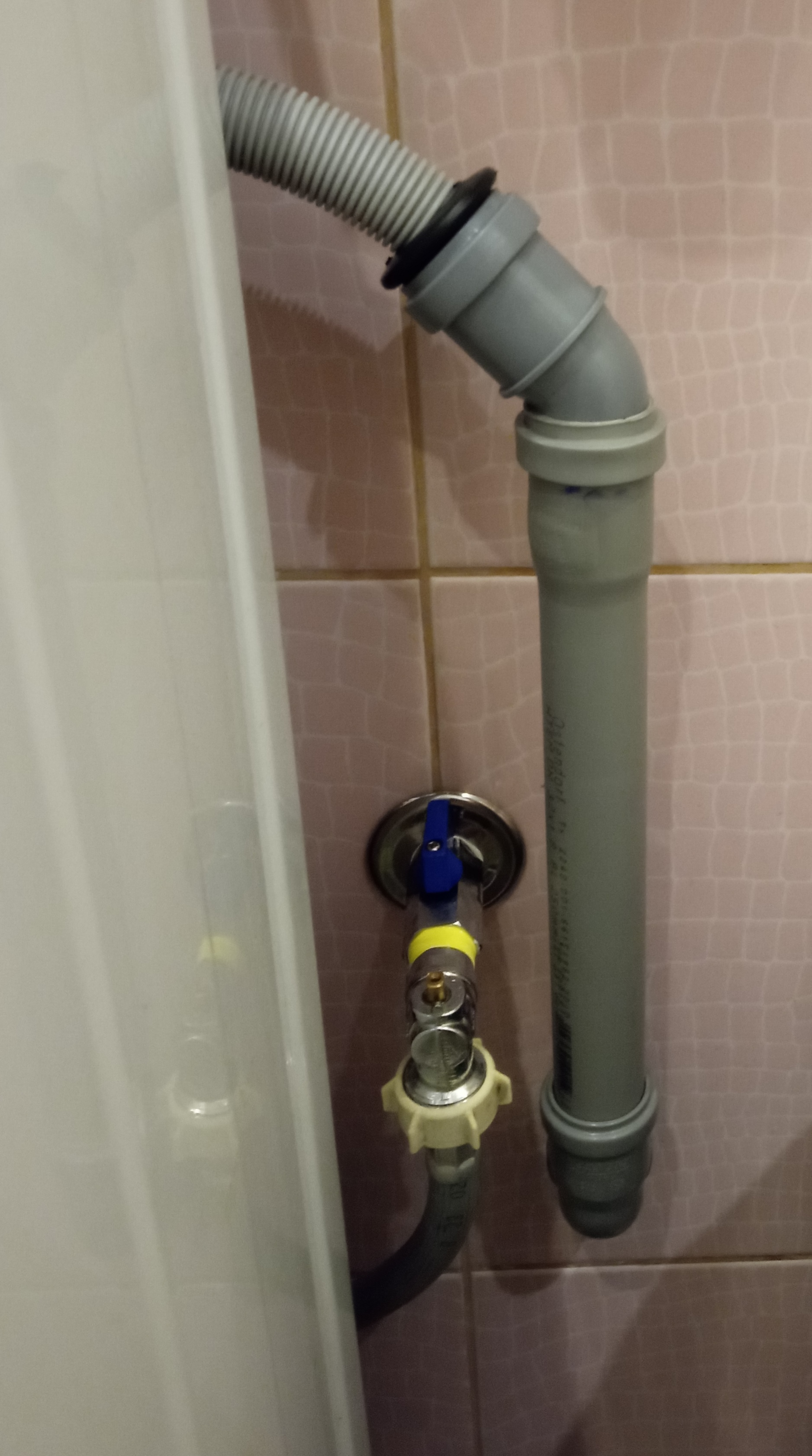
Automatic washing machine fittings. On the left is a ball valve from the water supply and a water inlet hose. On the right is a drainage pipe made of PVC pipes, to which a drain hose is connected.

=== World War II and after ===
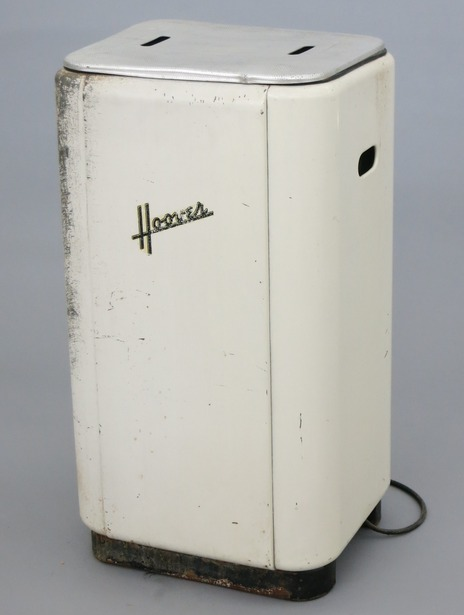
A Hoover 0307, manufactured from 1947 to 1957

After the attack on Pearl Harbor, US domestic washer production was suspended for the duration of World War II in favor of manufacturing war materiel. However, numerous US appliance manufacturers were permitted to undertake the research and development of washers during the war years. Many took the opportunity to develop automatic machines, realizing that these represented the future of the industry.

A large number of US manufacturers introduced competing automatic machines (mainly of the top-loading type) in the late 1940s and early 1950s. General Electric also introduced its first top-loading automatic model in 1947. This machine had many of the features that are incorporated into modern machines. Another early form of automatic washing machine manufactured by The Hoover Company used cartridges to program different wash cycles. This system, called the "Keymatic", used plastic cartridges with key-like slots and ridges around the edges. The cartridge was inserted into a slot on the machine and a mechanical reader operated the machine accordingly.

Several manufacturers produced semi-automatic machines, requiring the user to intervene at one or two points in the wash cycle. A common semi-automatic type (available from Hoover in the UK until at least the 1970s) included two tubs: one with an agitator or impeller for washing, plus another smaller tub for water extraction or centrifugal rinsing. These machines, as well as other older designs like the manual rotating drum, are still available, but are typically only used in circumstances where a standard water and power hookup for a washing machine is unavailable. Many are marketed for camping due to their light weight and ability to function without a water connection.

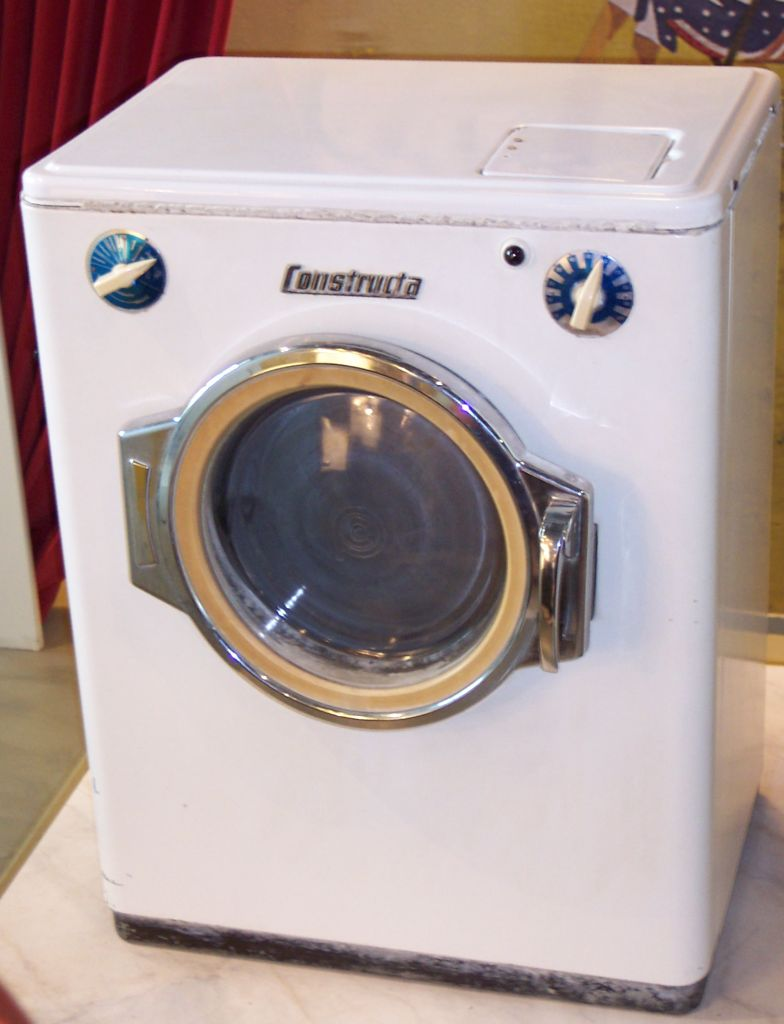
A 1950s model from Constructa

Since their introduction, automatic washing machines have relied on electromechanical timers to sequence the washing and extraction process. Electromechanical timers consist of a series of cams on a common shaft driven by a small electric motor via a reduction gearbox. At the appropriate time in the wash cycle, each cam actuates a switch to engage or disengage a particular part of the machinery (for example, the drain pump motor). One of the first was invented in 1957 by Winston L. Shelton and Gresham N. Jennings, then both General Electric engineers. The device was granted US Patent 2870278.

On the early electromechanical timers, the motor ran at a constant speed throughout the wash cycle, although the user could truncate parts of the program by manually advancing the control dial. However, by the 1950s demand for greater flexibility in the wash cycle led to the introduction of more sophisticated electrical timers to supplement the electromechanical timer. These newer timers enabled greater variation in functions such as the wash time. With this arrangement, the electric timer motor is periodically switched off to permit the clothing to soak and is only re-energized just before a micro-switch being engaged or disengaged for the next stage of the process. Fully electronic timers did not become widespread until decades later.

Despite the high cost of automatic washers, manufacturers had difficulty meeting the demand. Although there were material shortages during the Korean War, by 1953 automatic washing machine sales in the US exceeded those of wringer-type electric machines.

In the UK and most of Europe, electric washing machines did not become popular until the 1950s. This was largely because of the economic impact of World War II on the consumer market, which did not properly recover until the late 1950s. The early electric washers were single-tub wringer-type machines, as fully automatic washing machines were expensive.

During the 1960s, twin tub machines briefly became popular, helped by the low price of the Rolls Razor washers. Twin tub washing machines have two tubs, one larger than the other. The smaller tub in reality is a spinning drum for centrifugal drying while the larger tub only has an agitator in its bottom. Some machines could pump used wash water into a separate tub for temporary storage and to later pump it back for re-use. This was done not to save water or soap, but because heated water was expensive and time-consuming to produce. Automatic washing machines did not become dominant in the UK until well into the 1970s and by then were almost exclusively of the front-loader design.

In early automatic washing machines, any changes in impeller/drum speed were achieved by mechanical means or by a rheostat on the motor power supply. However, since the 1970s electronic control of motor speed has become a common feature on the more expensive models.

=== Cost-cutting and contemporary development ===
Over time manufacturers of automatic washers have gone to great lengths to reduce costs. For instance, expensive gearboxes are no longer required, since motor speed can be controlled electronically. Some models can be controlled via Wi-Fi, and have angled/tilted drums to facilitate loading.

Even on some expensive washers, the outer drum of front-loading machines is often (but not always) made of plastic (it can also be made out of metal, but this is expensive). This makes changing the main bearings difficult, as the plastic drum usually cannot be separated into two halves to enable the inner drum to be removed to gain access to the bearing.

Many residential front-loading washing machines typically have a 25 kg (55 lb) concrete block to dampen vibration. Alternatives include a plastic counterweight that can be filled with water after delivery, reducing or controlling motor speeds, using hydraulic suspensions instead of spring suspensions, and having freely moving steel balls or liquid contained inside a ring mounted on both the top and bottom of the drum to counter the weight of the clothes and reduce vibration.

Most newer front-load machines now use a brushless DC (BLDC) motor directly connected to the basket (direct drive), where the stator assembly is attached to the rear of the outer plastic drum assembly, whilst the co-axial rotor is mounted on the shaft of the inner drum. The direct drive motor eliminates the need for a pulley, belt, and belt tensioner. It was first introduced to washing machines by Fisher & Paykel in 1991 in the Australasian market. Since then, other manufacturers have followed suit. Some washing machines with this type of motor now come with 10-year or 20-year warranties, and offer faster spin speeds (Fisher & Paykel models can reach max speeds of 1000-1100RPM). The motor type used is typically an outrunner, due to its slim design with variable speed and high torque. The rotor is connected to the inner tub through its center. It can be made of metal or plastic. Some older direct drive washers use induction motors instead of BLDC motors.

==== Additional features ====
The modern washing machine market has seen several innovations and features, examples including:

- Washing machines including water jets (also known as water sprays, jet sprays and water showers) and steam nozzles that claim to sanitize clothes, help reduce washing times, and remove soil from the clothes. Water jets get their water from the bottom of the drum, thus recirculating the water in the washer.
- Others have special drums with holes that will fill with water from the bottom of the tub and redeposit the water on top of the clothes. Some drums have elements with the shape of waves, pyramids, hexagons, domes, or diamonds.
- Some include titanium or ceramic heating elements that claim to eliminate calcium buildup in the element. They can heat water up to 95 °C (203 °F).
- Some high-end models have lights built into the washer itself to light the drum,
- Others have soap dispensers where the user fills a tank with detergent and softener and the washing machine automatically doses the detergent and softener and, in some cases, chooses the most appropriate wash cycle. In some models, the tanks come pre-filled and are installed and replaced with new tanks, also pre-filled or refilled by the user, in a dedicated compartment on the bottom of the machine.
- Some have support for single-use capsules containing enough laundry additives for one load. The capsules are installed in the detergent compartment.
- Many dilute the detergent before it comes in contact with the clothes, some by means of mixing the soap and water with air to make foam, which is then introduced into the drum and improves cleaning performance. Alternatively, micro bubbles may be used instead.
- Some have pulsators that are mounted on a plate on the bottom of the drum instead of an agitator. The plate spins, and the pulsators generate waves that help shake the soil out of the clothes. Many also include mechanisms to prevent or remove undissolved detergent residue on the detergent dispenser.
- It is possible to incorporate a blower and a nozzle to smooth wrinkles in clothes without removing them from the washer.
- Some manufacturers like LG Electronics and Samsung Electronics have introduced functions on their washers that allow users to troubleshoot common problems with their washers without having to contact technical support. LG's approach involves a phone receiving signals through sound tones, while Samsung's approach involves having the user take a photo of the washer's time display with a phone. In both methods, the problem and steps to resolve it are displayed on the phone itself. Some models are also NFC enabled. Some implementations are patented under US Patent US20050268669A1 and US Patent US20050097927A1.

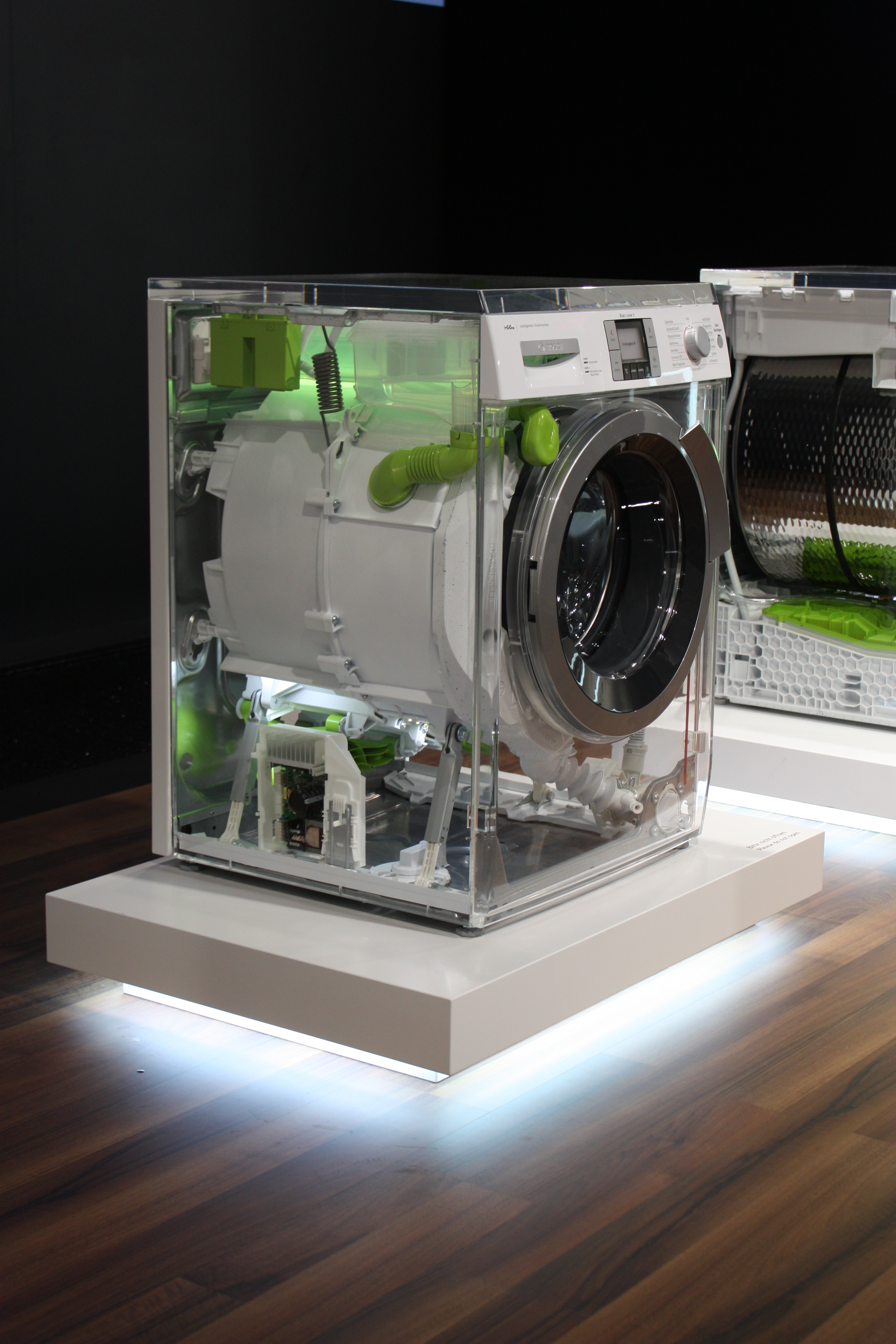
A see-through Bosch machine at the IFA 2010 in Berlin shows its internal components.

In 1976 Servis released the world's first microcontroller operated washing machine, the Servis Selectronic 301. In 1980 Hotpoint (UK) were the second manufacturer to produce a microcontroller based washing machine, the first of their top of line Microtronic series, the Hotpoint Microtronic X2000 both used chips from the Texas Instruments TMS1000 family of microcontrollers.

In the early 1990s, upmarket machines incorporated microcontrollers for the timing process. These proved reliable and cost-effective, so many cheaper machines now also incorporate microcontrollers rather than electromechanical timers. Since the 2010s, some machines have had touchscreen displays, full-color or color displays, or touch-sensitive control panels.

In 1991, New Zealand-based company Fisher & Paykel introduced its SmartDrive washing machine line into the Australasian market, before entering the North American market around 1998. This line of washing machine uses a computer-controlled system to determine factors such as load size and adjusts the wash cycle to match. It also used a mixed system of washing, first with the "Eco-Active" wash, using a low level of recirculated water being sprayed onto the load followed by a more traditional style wash. The SmartDrive also included a direct drive brushless DC electric motor, which simplified the bowl and agitator drive by eliminating the gearbox system. The SmartDrive series is known for its high spin speeds of up to 1100RPM, excellent wash performance, reliability, and water/energy efficiency.

In 1994, Staber Industries released the System 2000 washing machine, which is the only top-loading, horizontal-axis washer to be manufactured in the United States. The hexagonal tub spins like a front-loading machine, using only about one-third as much water as conventional top-loaders. This factor has led to an Energy Star rating for its high efficiency. This type of horizontal-axis washer and dryer (with a circular drum) is often used in Europe, where space is limited, as they can be as thin as 41 cm (16 in) in width.

In 2000, the British inventor James Dyson launched the CR01 ContraRotator, a type of washing machine with two cylinders rotating in opposite directions. It was claimed that this design reduced the wash time and produced cleaner washing than a single-cylinder machine. In 2004 the launch of the CR02, was the first washing machine to gain the British Allergy Foundation Seal of Approval. However, neither of the ContraRotator machines is now in production as they were expensive to manufacture. They were discontinued in 2005. It is patented under U.S. Patent US7750531B2, U.S. Patent US6311527, U.S. Patent US20010023513, U.S. Patent US6311527B1, U.S. Patent USD450164.

In 2001, Whirlpool Corporation introduced the Calypso, the first vertical-axis high-efficiency washing machine to be top-loading. A washplate in the bottom of the tub nutated (a special wobbling motion) to bounce, shake, and toss the laundry. Simultaneously, water containing detergent was sprayed onto the laundry. The machine proved to be good at cleaning but gained a bad reputation due to frequent breakdowns and destruction of laundry. The washer was recalled with a class-action lawsuit and pulled off the market.

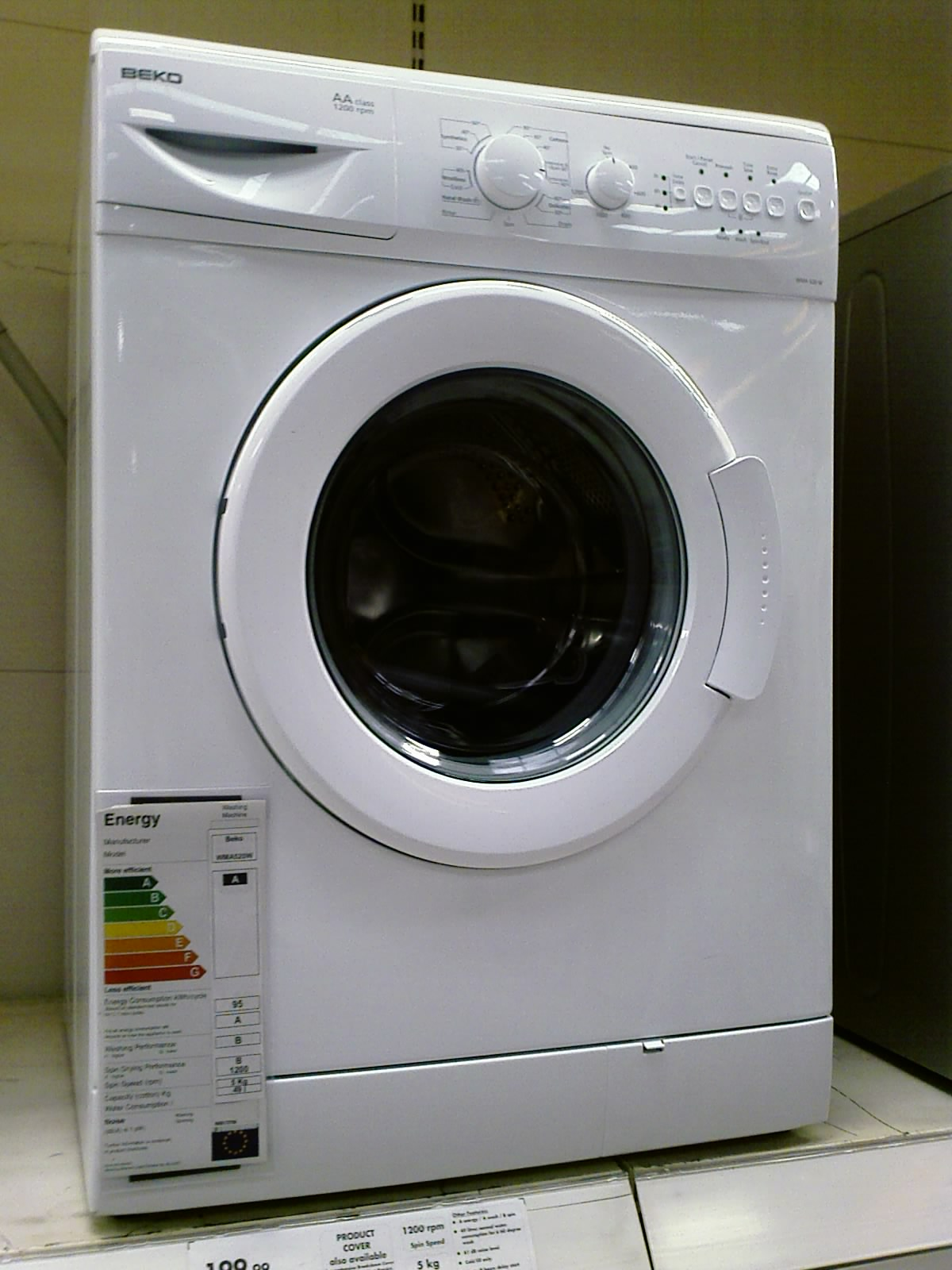
A Beko washing machine; modern household washing machines start at 1 kg (2 lb) capacity, designed for smaller households, and span to 24 kg (53 lb) load capacity.

In 2003, Maytag introduced their top-loading Neptune TL FAV6800A and TL FAV9800A washers. Instead of an agitator, the machine had two washplates, perpendicular to each other and at a 45-degree angle from the bottom of the tub. The machine would fill with only a small amount of water and the two wash plates would spin, tumbling the load within it, mimicking the action of a front-loading washer in a vertical-axis design.

In 2006, Sanyo introduced the "world-first" (as of February 2, 2006, with regards to home use drum-type washer/dryer) drum-type washing machine with "Air Wash" function (i.e.: using ozone as a disinfectant). It also reused and disinfected rinse water. This washing machine uses only 50 L (11.0 imp gal; 13.2 US gal) of water in the recycle mode.

Approximately in 2012, eco-indicators were introduced, capable of predicting the energy demand based on the customer settings in terms of program and temperature.

Features available in most modern consumer washing machines:

- Delayed execution: a timer to delay the start of the laundry cycle
- Predefined programs for different laundry types
- Rotation speed settings
- Variable temperatures, including cold wash

Additionally, some modern machines feature:

- Child lock
- Steam
- Time remaining indication
- Extra water/rinse.
- UV disinfection.

Around 2015 and 2017, some manufacturers (namely Samsung and LG Electronics) offered washers and dryers that either have a top-loading washer and dryer built on top of a front-loading washer and dryer respectively (in Samsung washers and dryers) or offer users an optional top-loading washer that can be installed under a washer or dryer (for LG washers and dryers) Both manufacturers have also introduced front-loading washers allowing users to add items after a wash cycle has started, and Samsung has also introduced top-loading washers with a built-in sink and a detergent dispenser that claims to leave no residue on the dispenser itself. In IFA 2017, Samsung released the QuickDrive, a front-loading washer similar to the Dyson ContraRotator but instead of two counter-rotating drums, the QuickDrive has a single drum with a counter-rotating impeller mounted on the back of the drum. Samsung claims this technique reduces cycle times by half and energy consumption by 20%. The US has introduced standards for washing machines that improve their energy efficiency and reduce their water consumption.

== Types ==
=== Top-loading ===
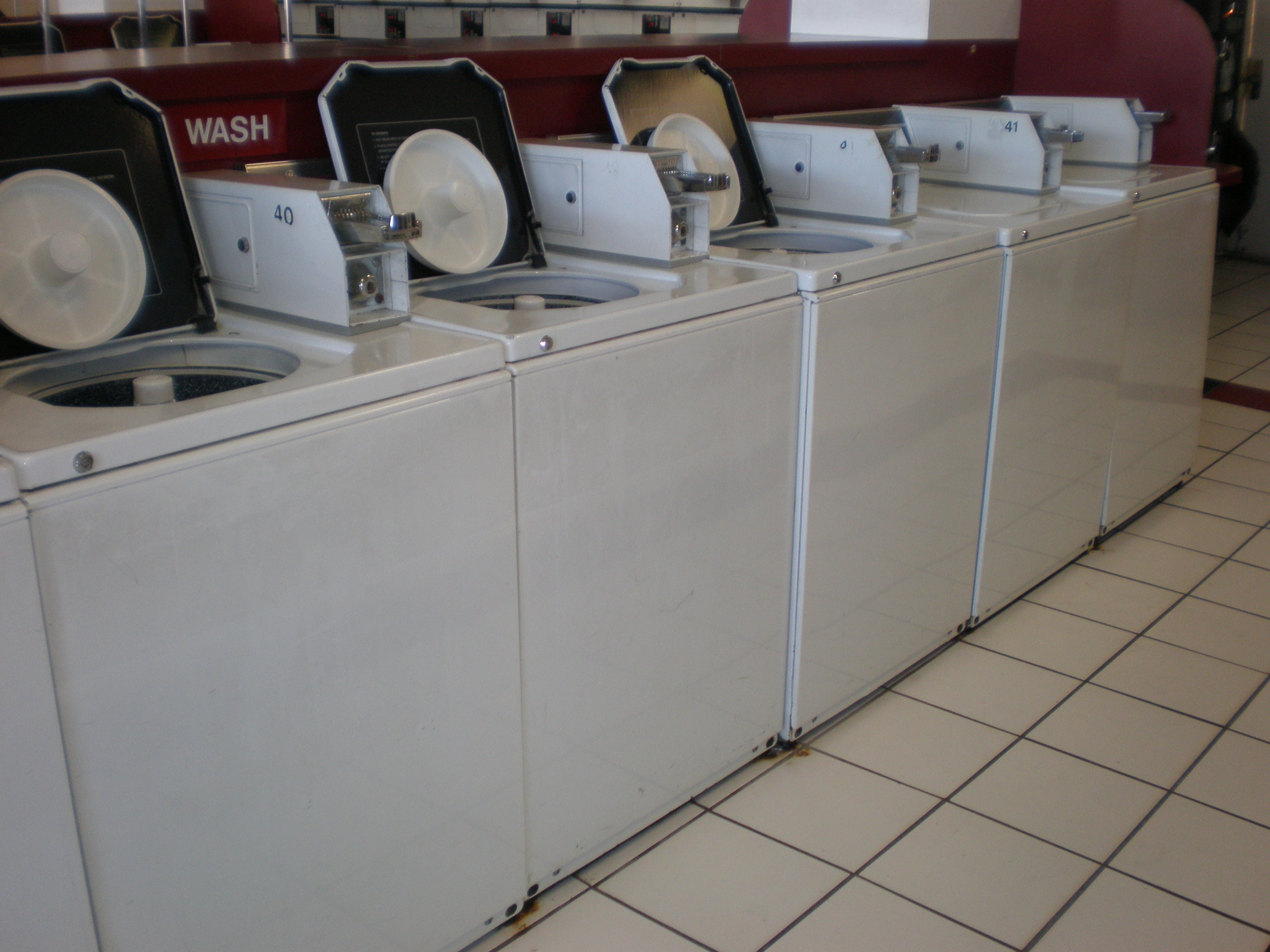
General Electric Filter-Flo top-loading, vertical-axis machines installed in a laundromat. The pans on the inside of the lid are placed atop the agitator, and wash water is pumped through the perforated pans to collect lint. (California)

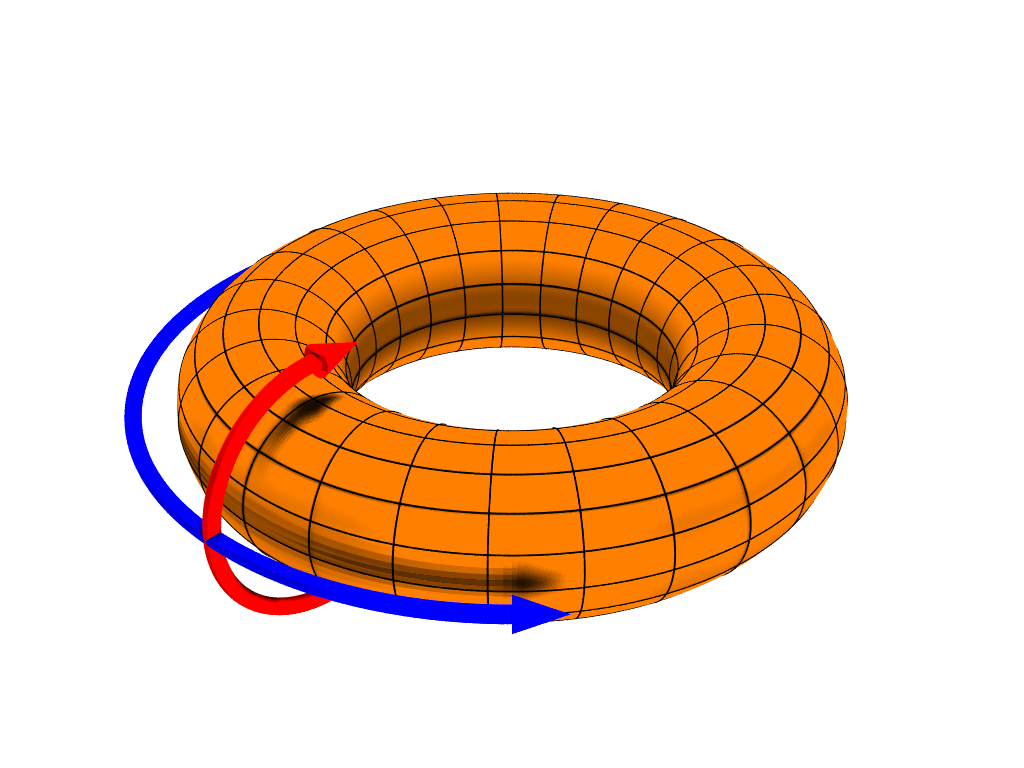
In a top-loading washer, water circulates primarily along the poloidal axis during the wash cycle, as indicated by the red arrow in this illustration of a torus.

The top-loading, vertical-axis washer has been the dominant design in the United States and Canada. This design places the clothes in a vertically mounted perforated basket that is contained within a water-retaining tub, with a finned water-pumping agitator in the center of the bottom of the basket. Clothes are loaded through the top of the machine, which is usually but not always covered with a hinged door. The drum of a top loading washing machine can include a lint trap.

==== Agitation ====
During the wash cycle, the outer tub is filled with water sufficient to fully immerse and suspend the clothing freely in the basket. The movement of the agitator pushes water outward between the paddles towards the edge of the tub. The water then moves outward, up the sides of the basket, towards the center, and then down towards the agitator to repeat the process, in a circulation pattern similar to the shape of a torus. The agitator direction is periodically reversed because continuous motion in one direction would just lead to the water spinning around the basket with the agitator rather than the water being pumped in the torus-shaped motion. Some washers supplement the water-pumping action of the agitator with a large rotating screw on the shaft above the agitator, to help move water downwards in the center of the basket. A washing machine can have an impeller, also called a wash plate, instead of an agitator, which serves the same purpose but does not have a vertical cylinder extending from its base.

Since the agitator and the drum are separate and distinct in a top-loading washing machine, the mechanism of a top-loader is inherently more complicated than a front-loading machine. Manufacturers have devised several ways to control the motion of the agitator during the wash and rinse separately from the high-speed rotation of the drum required for the spin cycle. While a top-loading washing machine could use a universal motor or DC brushless motor, it is conventional for top-loading washing machines to use more expensive, heavy, and potentially more electrically efficient and reliable induction motors.

An alternative to this oscillating agitator design is the impeller-type washtub pioneered by Hoover on its long-running Hoovermatic series of top-loading machines. Here, an impeller (trademarked by Hoover as a "Pulsator") mounted on the side of the tub spins in a constant direction and creates a fast-moving current of water in the tub which drags the clothes through the water along a toroidal path. This design was used in the Hoover 0307 washer. The impeller design has the advantage of mechanical simplicity – a single-speed motor with belt drive is all that is required to drive the Pulsator with no need for gearboxes or complex electrical controls, but has the disadvantage of lower load capacity in relation to tub size. Hoovermatic machines were made mostly in twin-tub format for the European market (where they competed with Hotpoint's Supermatic line which used the oscillating agitator design) until the early 1990s. Some industrial garment testing machines still use the Hoover wash action. Another alternative involves 'pulsating' the agitator, in other words having an agitator with a reciprocating motion along its vertical axis. Some washing machines have agitators that move in an orbiting motion or agitators that nutate at the bottom. Special top loading washing machines designed for washing sneakers can incorporate bristles in their agitators. Alternatively the inner tub itself can nutate inside the outer tub.

==== Reversible motor ====
In many current top-loading washers, if the motor spins in one direction, the gearbox drives the agitator; if the motor spins the other way, the gearbox locks the agitator and spins the basket and agitator together. Similarly, if the pump motor rotates one way it recirculates the sudsy water; in the other direction it pumps water from the machine during the spin cycle. Mechanically, this system is very simple.

==== Mode-changing transmission ====
In some top-loaders, the motor runs only in one direction. During agitation, the transmission converts the rotation into the alternating motion driving the agitator. During the spin cycle, the timer turns on a solenoid which engages a clutch locking the motor's rotation to the wash basket, providing a spin cycle. General Electric's very popular line of Filter-Flo (seen to the right) used a variant of this design where the motor reversed only to pump water out of the machine. The same clutch which allows the heavy tub full of wet clothes to "slip" as it comes up to the motor's speed, is also allowed to "slip" during agitation to engage a Gentle Cycle for delicate clothes.

Whirlpool (Kenmore) created a popular design demonstrating the complex mechanisms which could be used to produce different motions from a single motor with the so-called "wig wag" mechanism, which was used for decades until modern controls rendered it obsolete. In the Whirlpool mechanism, a protruding moving piece oscillates in time with the agitation motion. Two solenoids are mounted to this protruding moving piece, with wires attaching them to the timer. During the cycle, the motor operates continuously, and the solenoids on the "wig wag" engage in agitation or spin. Despite the wires controlling the solenoids being subject to abrasion and broken connections due to their constant motion and the solenoids operating in a damp environment where corrosion could damage them, these machines were surprisingly reliable.

==== Reversible motor with mode-changing transmission ====
Some top-loaders, especially compact apartment-sized washers, use a hybrid mechanism. The motor reverses direction every few seconds, often with a pause between direction changes, to perform the agitation. The spin cycle is accomplished by engaging a clutch in the transmission. A separate motorized pump is generally used to drain this style of machine. These machines could easily be implemented with universal motors or more modern DC brushless motors, but older ones tend to use a capacitor-start induction motor with a pause between reversals of agitation.

=== Front-loading ===
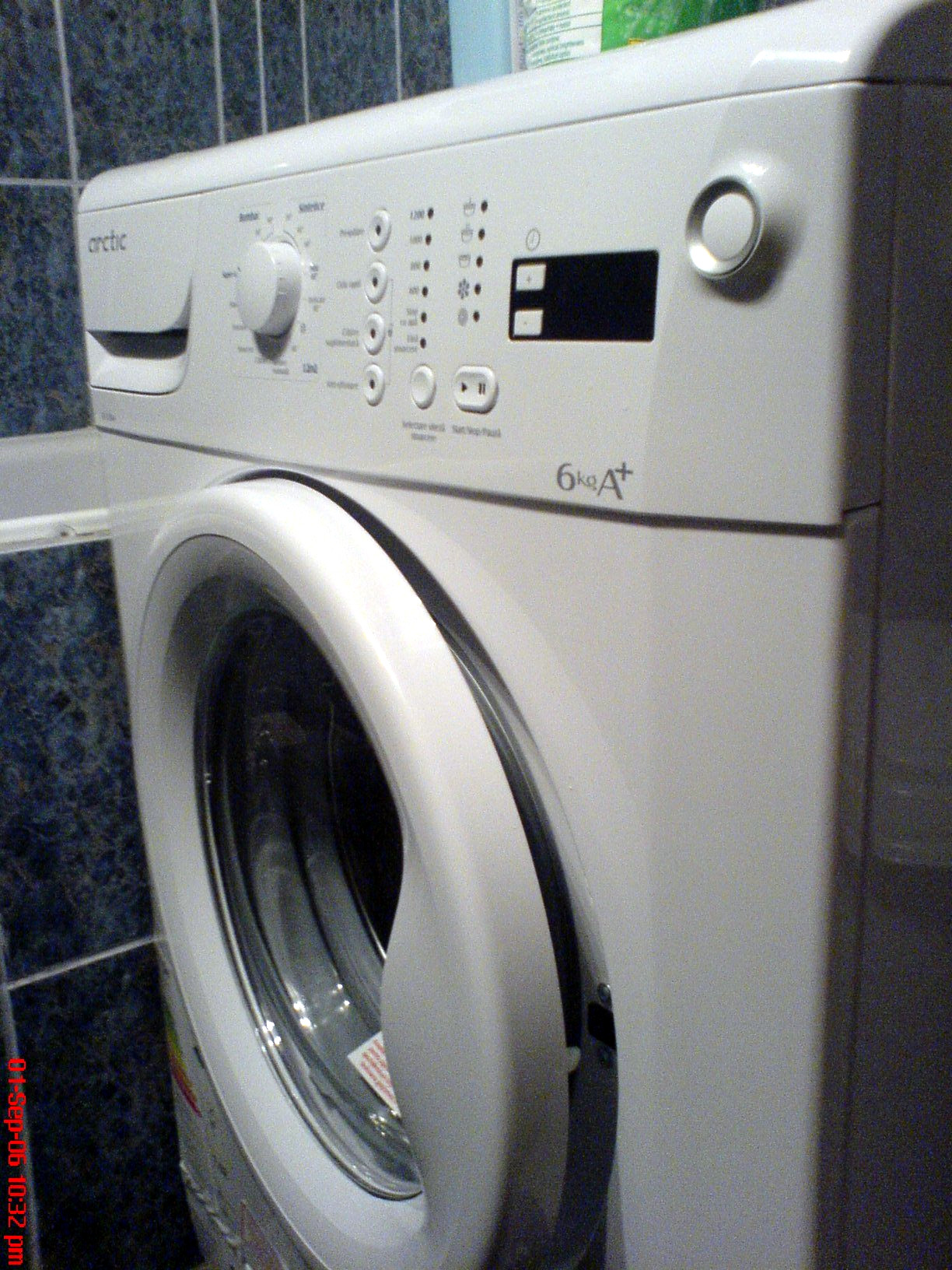
Arctic BE1200A+ is a front-loading budget model sold in 2008 with 6-kilogram (13 lb) load, LCD indicator, operating up to 1200 RPM.

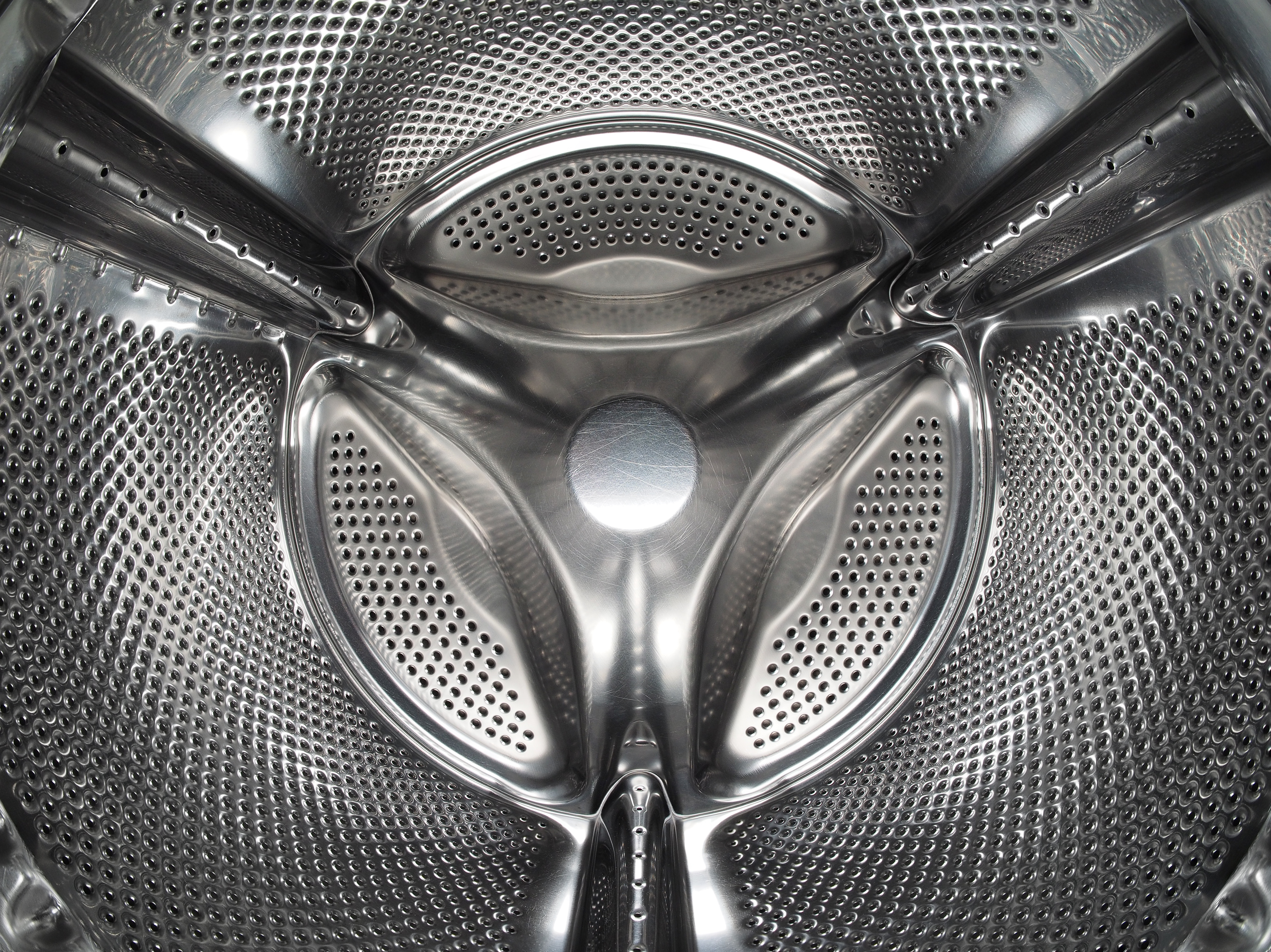
Modern drum of front-loading washing machine (Bosch Maxx WFO 2440)

The front-loading or horizontal-axis clothes washer is the dominant design in Europe and in most parts of the world. In the United States and Canada, most "high-end" washing machines are of this type. In addition, most commercial and industrial clothes washers around the world are of the horizontal-axis design.

This layout mounts the inner drum and outer drum horizontally, and loading is through a door at the front of the machine. The door often but not always contains a transparent window. Agitation is supplied by the back-and-forth rotation of the cylinder and by gravity. The clothes are lifted by paddles on the inside wall of the drum and then dropped. This motion flexes the weave of the fabric and forces water and detergent solution through the clothes load. Because the wash action does not require the clothing to be freely suspended in water, only enough water is needed to moisten the fabric. Because less water is required, front-loaders typically use less soap, and the repeated dropping and folding action of the tumbling can easily produce large amounts of foam or suds.

Front-loaders control water usage through the surface tension of water, and the capillary wicking action this creates in the fabric weave. A front-loader washer always fills to the same low water level, but a large pile of dry clothing standing in water will soak up the moisture, causing the water level to drop. The washer then refills to maintain the original water level. Because it takes time for this water absorption to occur with a motionless pile of fabric, nearly all front-loaders begin the washing process by slowly tumbling the clothing under the stream of water entering and filling the drum, to rapidly saturate the clothes with water.

Compared to top-loading washers, clothing can be packed more tightly in a front loader, up to the full drum volume if using a cotton wash cycle. This is because wet cloth usually fits into a smaller space than dry cloth, and front-loaders can self-regulate the water needed to achieve correct washing and rinsing. However, extreme overloading of front-loading washers pushes fabrics towards the small gap between the loading door and the front of the inner drum, potentially resulting in fabrics lost between the inner drum and outer tub, and in severe cases, tearing of clothing and jamming the motion of the inner drum.

==== Mechanical aspects ====
Front-loading washers are mechanically simple compared to top-loaders, with the main motor (a universal motor or variable-frequency drive motor) normally being connected to the drum via a grooved pulley belt and large pulley wheel without the need for a gearbox, clutch or crank. The action of a front-loading washing machine is better suited to a motor capable of reversing direction with every reversal of the wash drum; a universal motor is noisier, less efficient, and does not last as long, but is better suited to the task of reversing direction every few seconds. Some models, such as those by LG, use a motor directly connected to the drum, eliminating the need for a belt and pulley.

However, front-load washers suffer from their own technical challenges due to the horizontal disposition of the drum. A top-loading washer keeps water inside the tub merely through the force of gravity pulling down on the water, while a front-loader must tightly seal the door with a gasket to prevent water dripping onto the floor during the wash cycle. This access door is locked shut with an interlocking device during the entire wash cycle, since opening the door with the machine in use could result in water gushing onto the floor. If this interlock is broken for any reason, such a machine stops operation, even if this failure happens mid-cycle. In most machines, the interlock is usually doubly redundant to prevent either opening with the drum full of water or being opened during the spin cycle. For front-loaders without viewing windows on the door, it is possible to accidentally pinch the fabric between the door and the drum, resulting in tearing and damage to the pinched clothing during tumbling and spinning.

Nearly all front-loader washers for the consumer market also use a folded flexible bellows assembly around the door opening to keep clothing contained inside the drum during the tumbling wash cycle. If this bellows assembly were not used, small articles of clothing such as socks could slip out of the wash drum near the door and fall down the narrow slot between the outer and inner drums, plugging the drain and possibly jamming rotation of the inner drum. Retrieving lost items from between the outer drum and inner drum can require complete disassembly of the front of the washer and pulling out the entire inner wash drum. Commercial and industrial front-loaders used by businesses (described below) usually do not use the bellows, but instead require all small objects to be placed in a mesh bag to prevent loss near the drum opening.

=== Variant and hybrid designs ===
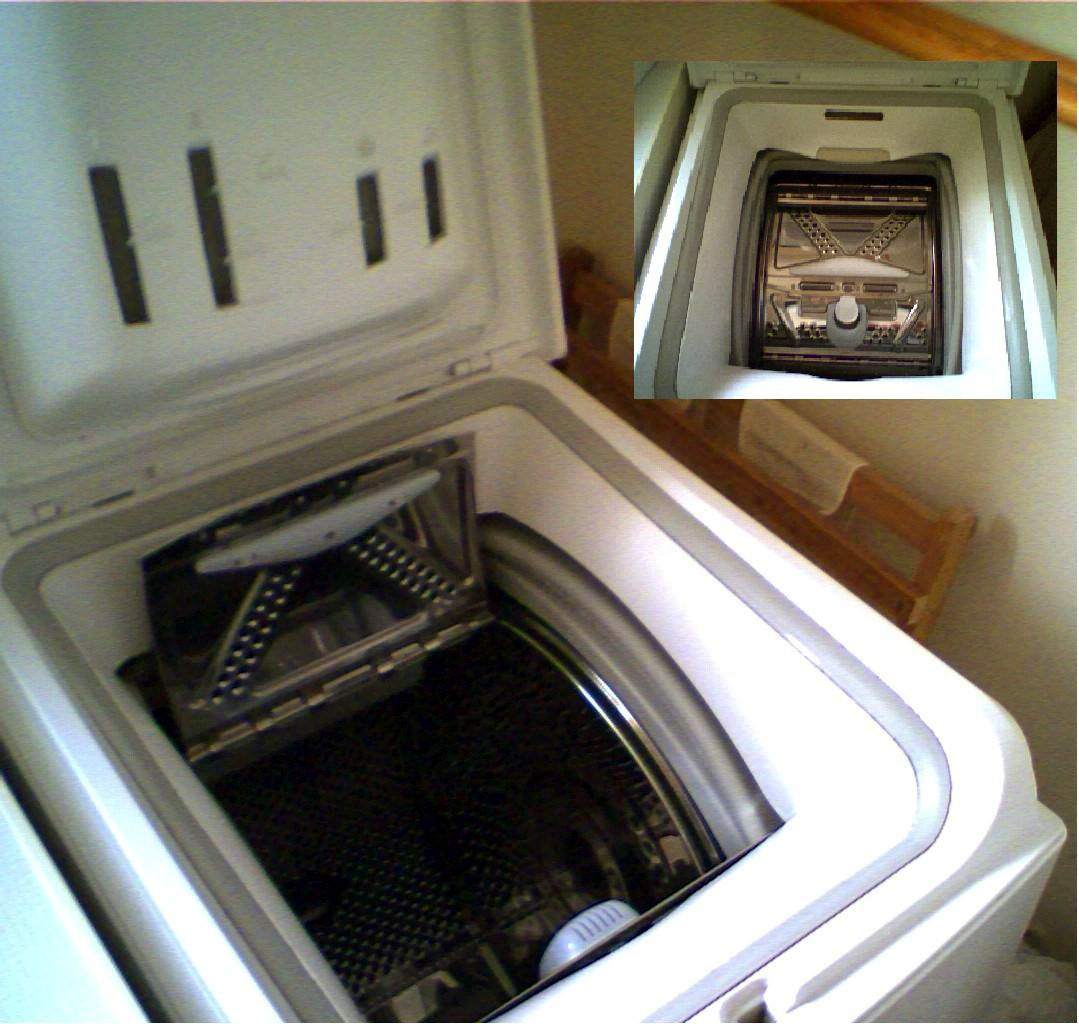
European top-loader with horizontal-axis rotating drum (2008)

There are many variations of the two general designs. Top-loading machines in Asia use impellers instead of agitators. Impellers are similar to agitators except that they do not have the center post extending up in the middle of the washtub basket.

==== Horizontal-axis top-loader ====
Some machines which load from the top are otherwise much more similar to front-loading horizontal-axis drum machines. They have a drum rotating around a horizontal axis, as a front-loader, but there is no front door; instead, there is a liftable lid that provides access to the drum, which has a hatch that can be latched shut. Clothes are loaded, the hatch and lid are closed, and the machine operates and spins just like a front loader. These machines are narrower but usually taller than front-loaders, usually have a lower capacity, and are intended for use where only a narrow space is available, as is sometimes the case in Europe. They have incidental advantages: they can be loaded while standing (but force the user to bend down instead of crouching down or sitting to unload); they do not require a perishable rubber bellows seal; and instead of the drum having a single bearing on one side, it has a pair of symmetrical bearings, one on each side, avoiding asymmetrical bearing loading and potentially increasing life.

==== Combo washer dryer ====
There are also combo washer dryer machines that combine washing cycles and a full drying cycle in the same drum, eliminating the need to transfer wet clothes from a washer to a dryer machine. In principle, these machines are convenient for overnight cleaning (the combined cycle is considerably longer), but the effective capacity for cleaning larger batches of laundry is drastically reduced. The drying process tends to use much more energy than using two separate devices, because a combo washer dryer not only must dry the clothing but also needs to dry out the wash chamber itself.

These machines are used more where space is at a premium, such as areas of Europe and Japan because they can be fit into small spaces, perform both washing and drying, and many can be operated without dedicated utility connections. In these machines, the washer and dryer functions often have different capacities, with the dryer usually having the lowest capacity.

These combo machines should not be confused with a dryer on top of a washer installation, or with a laundry center, which is a one-piece appliance offering a compromise between a washer-dryer combo and a full washer to the side of the dryer installation or a dryer on top of a washer installation. Laundry centers usually have the dryer on top of the washer, with the controls for both machines being on a single control panel. Often, the controls are simpler than the controls on a washer-dryer combo or a dedicated washer and dryer. Some implementations are patented under US Patent US6343492B1 and US Patent US 6363756B1.

=== Comparison ===
True front-loading machines, top-loading machines with horizontal-axis drums, and true top-loading vertical-axis machines can be compared on several aspects:

- Efficient cleaning: Front loaders usually use less energy, water, and detergent compared to the best top-loaders. High-efficiency washers use 20% to 60% of the detergent, water, and energy of "standard" commonly used top-loader washers. They usually take somewhat longer (20–110 minutes) to wash a load, but are often computer controlled with additional sensors, to adapt the wash cycle to the needs of each load.
- Water usage: Front-loaders usually use less water than top-loading residential clothes washers. Estimates are that front-loaders use from one-third to one half as much water as top-loaders.
- Spin-dry effectiveness: Front-loaders (and European horizontal-axis top-loaders and some front-loaders) offer much higher maximum spin speeds of up to 2000 RPM, although home machines tend to be in the 1000 to 1400 RPM range, while top-loaders (with agitators) do not exceed 1140 RPM. High-efficiency top-loaders with a wash plate (instead of an agitator) can spin up to 1100 RPM, as their center of gravity is lower. Higher spin speeds, along with the diameter of the drum, determine the g-force, and a higher g-force removes more residual water, making clothes dry faster. This also reduces energy consumption if clothes are dried in a clothes dryer.
- Cycle length: Top-loaders have tended to have shorter cycle times, in part because their design has traditionally emphasized simplicity and speed of operation more than resource conservation. It is observed that top-loaders wash the clothes in half the time as compared to a front-load washing machine.
- Wear and abrasion: Top-loaders require an agitator or impeller mechanism to force enough water through clothes to clean them effectively, which greatly increases mechanical wear and tear on fabrics. Front-loaders use paddles in the drum to repeatedly pick up and drop clothes into the water for cleaning; this gentler action causes less wear and tear. The rate of clothes wear can be roughly gauged by the amount of accumulation in a clothes dryer lint filter, since the lint largely consists of stray fibers detached from textiles during washing and drying.
- Difficult items: Top-loaders may have trouble cleaning large items, such as sleeping bags or pillows, which tend to float on top of the wash water rather than circulate within it. In addition, vigorous top-loader agitator motions may damage delicate fabrics. Whereas in a front-load washing machine, one can easily wash pillows, shoes, soft toys, and other difficult-to-wash items.
- Noise: Front-loaders tend to operate more quietly than top-loaders because the door seal helps contain noise, and because there is less of a tendency towards imbalance. Top loaders usually need a mechanical transmission (due to agitators, see above), which can generate more noise than the rubber belt or direct drive found in most front-loaders.
- Compactness: True front-loading machines may be installed underneath counter-height work surfaces. A front-loading washing machine, in a fully fitted kitchen, may even be disguised as a kitchen cabinet. These models can also be convenient in homes with limited floor area, since the clothes dryer may be installed directly above the washer ("stacked" configuration).
- Water leakage: Top-loading machines are less prone to leakage because simple gravity reliably keeps water from spilling out the loading door on top. True front-loading machines require a flexible seal or gasket on the front door, and the front door must be locked during operation to prevent opening, lest large amounts of water spill out. This seal may leak and require replacement. However, many current front-loaders use so little water that they can be stopped mid-cycle for the addition or removal of laundry, while keeping the water level in the horizontal tub below the door level. Best practice installations of either type of machine will include a floor drain or an overflow catch tray with a drain connection, since neither design is immune to leakage or a solenoid valve getting stuck in the open position.
- Maintenance and reliability: Top-loading washers are more tolerant of maintenance neglect, and may not need a regular "freshening" cycle to clean door seals and bellows. During the spin cycle, a top-loading tub is free to move about inside the cabinet of the machine, using only a lip around the top of the inner basket and outer tub to keep the spinning water and clothing from spraying out over the edge. Therefore, the potentially problematic door-sealing and door-locking mechanisms used by true front-loaders are not needed. On the other hand, top-loaders use mechanical gearboxes that are more vulnerable to wear than simpler front-load motor drives.
- Accessibility and ergonomics: Front-loaders are more convenient for shorter people and those with paraplegia, as the controls are front-mounted and the horizontal drum eliminates the need for standing or climbing. Risers, also referred to as pedestals, often with storage drawers underneath, can be used to raise the door of a true front-loader closer to the user's level. However, if stacked, the dryer controls, if at the top of the dryer, may be too tall for shorter people to conveniently access.
- Initial cost: In countries where top-loaders are popular, front-loaders tend to be more expensive to buy than top-loaders, though their lower operating costs can lead to lower total cost of ownership, especially if energy, detergent, or water are expensive. On the other hand, in countries with a large front-loader user base, top-loaders are usually seen as alternatives and more expensive than basic off-brand front-loaders, although without many differences in total cost of ownership apart from design-originated ones. In addition, manufacturers have tended to include more advanced features such as internal water heating, automatic dirt sensors, and high-speed emptying on front loaders, although some of these features could be implemented on top loaders.

== Wash cycles ==
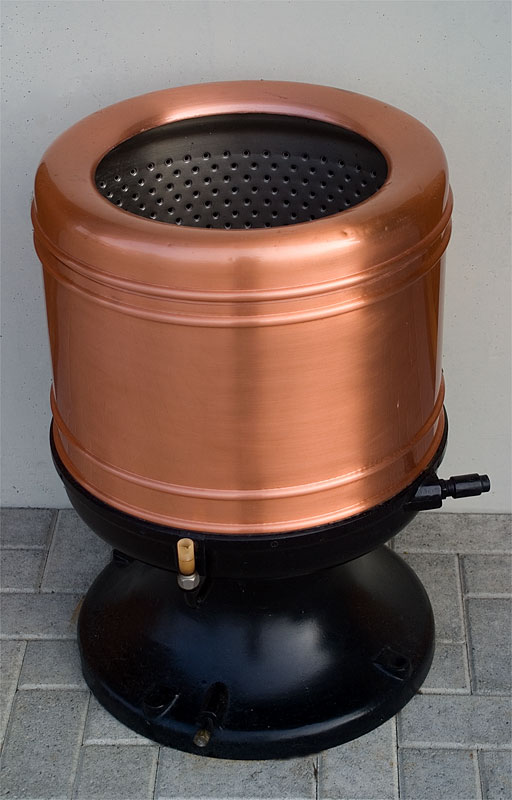
German laundry centrifuge to extract water from laundry; the advent of automatic washing machines with spin cycles made such specialized appliances largely obsolete by the 1970s.

The earliest washing machines simply carried out a washing action when loaded with clothes and soap, filled with hot water, and started. Over time machines became more and more automated, first with complex electromechanical controllers, then fully electronic controllers; users put clothes into the machine, select a suitable program via a switch, start the machine, and come back to remove clean and slightly damp clothes at the end of the cycle. The controller starts and stops many different processes including pumps and valves to fill and empty the drum with water, heating, and rotating at different speeds, with different combinations of settings for different fabrics.

Longer wash cycles can allow greater water and energy efficiency (with less water to heat up). For a 3.5 kg (7.7 lb) load, from 2011 to 2021, the average Australian washing machine cycle (including rinsing and spinning) has lengthened from 99 to 144 minutes for front-loaders, and 55 to 59 minutes for top-loaders.

=== Washing ===
Many front-loading machines have internal electrical heating elements to heat the wash water, to near boiling if desired. The rate of the chemical cleaning action of the detergent and other laundry chemicals increases greatly with temperature, by the Arrhenius equation. Washing machines with internal heaters can use special detergents formulated to release different chemical ingredients at different temperatures, allowing different types of stains and soils to be cleaned from the clothes as the wash water is heated by the electrical heater.

However, higher-temperature washing uses more energy, and many fabrics and elastics are damaged at higher temperatures. Temperatures exceeding 40 °C (104 °F) have the undesirable effect of deactivating the enzymes when using biological detergent.

Many machines are cold-fill, connected to cold water only, which they internally heat to operating temperature. Where water can be heated more cheaply or with less carbon dioxide emission than by electricity, a cold-fill operation is inefficient. Some modern machines have "cold" and "tap cold" wash settings, where "tap cold" refers to using cold water directly from the incoming cold water line and "cold" involving heating to between 60 °F (16 °C) and 80 °F (27 °C).

Front-loaders need to use low-sudsing detergents because the tumbling action of the drum entrains air into the clothes load, which can cause excessive foamy suds and overflows. However, due to the efficient use of water and detergent, the suds issue with front-loaders can be controlled by simply using less detergent, without lessening the cleaning action.

=== Rinsing ===
Washing machines perform several rinses after the main wash to remove most of the detergent. Modern washing machines use less hot water due to environmental concerns; however, this has led to the problem of poor rinsing on many washing machines on the market, which can be a problem to people who are sensitive to detergents. The Allergy UK website suggests re-running the rinse cycle, or rerunning the entire wash cycle without detergent.

In response to complaints, many washing machines allow the user to select additional rinse cycles, at the expense of higher water usage and longer cycle time. Bosch, for example, in its allergy wash program, incorporates an additional three-minute rinse cycle with water of at least 60 °C (140 °F) to rinse off detergent residues and any allergens.

=== Spin ===
Front-loading machines spin in multiple stages of their cycle: after main wash, after individual rinses, and the final high-speed spin. Some of those spins may be absent depending on the particular cycle.

Higher spin speeds, along with larger tub diameters, remove more water, leading to faster drying. On the other hand, the need for ironing can be reduced by not using the spin cycle in the washing machine.

If a heated clothes dryer is used after the wash and spin, energy use is reduced if more water has been removed from clothes. However, faster spinning can crease clothes more. Also, mechanical wear on bearings increases rapidly with rotational speed, reducing life. Early machines would spin at 300 RPM and, because of lack of any mechanical suspension, would often shake and vibrate.

In 1976, most front-loading washing machines spun at around 700 RPM, or less. Today, most machines spin at 1000–1600 RPM. Most machines have variable speeds, ranging 300–2000 RPM depending on the machine.

Separate spin dryers, without washing functionality, are available for specialized applications. For example, a small high-speed centrifuge machine may be provided in locker rooms of communal swimming pools to allow wet swimsuits to be substantially dried to a slightly damp condition after daily use.

Washing machines often incorporate balance rings filled with a liquid such as a calcium chloride salt water solution, that are designed to balance the inner drum of the washer during spin cycles. The balance ring may be filled with oil and contain balls on races, somewhat similarly to a ball bearing, to achieve the same effect. The Bendix Economat used a flexible rubber inner tub that would squeeze the clothes towards the agitator located in the center of the inner tub in order to remove water from the clothes, instead of spinning the inner tub. This was performed by exerting a vacuum on the inner tub.

=== Maintenance wash ===
Many home washing machines use a plastic, rather than metal, outer shell to contain the wash water; residue can build up on the plastic tub over time. Some manufacturers advise users to perform a regular maintenance or "freshening" wash to clean the inside of the washing machine of any mold, bacteria, encrusted detergent, and unspecified dirt more effectively than with a normal wash.

A maintenance wash is performed without any laundry, on the hottest wash program, adding substances such as white vinegar, 100 grams of citric acid, a detergent with bleaching properties, or a proprietary washing machine cleaner. The first injection of water goes into the sump so the machine can be allowed to fill for about 30 seconds before adding cleaning substances.

== Installation and flood prevention ==
Flexible rubber hoses are typically used to connect from a building water supply to a washing machine. These hoses are often exposed to full water pressure on a continuing basis and can deteriorate over time, developing bulges or weak spots that eventually cause leaks or catastrophic bursting and flooding. Since the hoses are often hidden from view, they may be difficult to inspect and easily forgotten until a problem occurs. If a hose burst occurs when nobody is present to notice the problem, a huge volume of water can be delivered over a short time, causing extensive interior flooding damage or even structural damage. It has been estimated that a burst supply hose can deliver two tons of water in an hour.

To reduce these risks, it is a common recommendation to use flexible hoses which have been jacketed with a braided stainless steel mesh. This jacketing cannot prevent leaks from developing, but it can slow the development of large bulges or "aneurysms" which can burst suddenly without warning. However, even braided metal jackets often cannot withstand the enormous pressures generated by water freezing within an enclosed volume.

An additional precaution is to install a washing machine inside a shallow metal or plastic pan, which can collect minor leakage and divert the water to a nearby drain, or to the outside of a building. Drain pans can also divert water released by other problems, such as a jammed solenoid valve in a washing machine. A serious limitation of drain pans is that they typically cannot handle the large volumes of pressurized water released by a burst supply hose, so a drain pan is no substitute for hose burst precautions. In the absence of a drain, a pan may still be useful to confine leakage temporarily, while a local or remote water alarm is triggered.

In addition or instead of an alarm, a water detector may signal the main water shutoff valve to the building to be automatically closed to prevent flooding.

A very effective precaution is to install a shutoff or isolation valve which stops any water from being supplied, except when a washing machine is actually operating. The simplest method is to manually open and close the hot and cold water shutoff valves (traditionally globe valves) behind the washing machine, each time it is used. This method relies on the washing machine user conscientiously operating the two valves each time laundry is done, in spite of the awkward location of the valves and the tedious process of turning the handles through multiple rotations.

An improvement over the traditional setup is to install a specialized laundry shutoff valve. Typically, it consists of two ball valves connected to a single handle, so they can be operated by a horizontal or vertical lever moved by 90 degrees. This makes the operation of the valves a quick procedure, but the washing machine user must still remember to turn off the water, even though the failure to do this produces no immediately obvious problems.

To close this risk exposure, some shutoff valves have a spring-energized mechanical timer which is started when the user pushes a lever to open the valves. After a preset time of several hours elapses, the spring-powered mechanism automatically closes the valve without further user intervention. A variant of this setup requires the user to press a button to open the valves for an electrically timed interval.

Other automatic valve operating mechanisms electronically detect when a washing machine draws electrical power as it starts, and then open the water supply valves. Typically, the power plug for the washing machine is connected to a special detector receptacle or cable, to allowing monitoring of the power draw.

Although pressurized water supply leaks can cause the most damage in the least amount of time, water drainage can also cause problems if not handled properly. Washing machine drainage hoses should be secured properly to prevent accidental dislodgement, and drains should be inspected and cleared periodically to prevent buildup of laundry lint, mold, and other deposits.

== Efficiency and standards ==
Capacity and cost are both considerations when purchasing a washing machine. All else being equal, a machine of higher capacity will cost more to buy, but will be more convenient if large amounts of laundry must be cleaned. Fewer runs of a machine of larger capacity may have lower running costs and better energy and water efficiency than frequent use of a smaller machine, particularly for large families. However, running a large machine with small loads is typically inefficient and wasteful, unless the machine has been designed to handle such situations.

For many years energy and water efficiency were not regulated, and little attention was paid to them. From the last part of the 20th century, increasing attention was paid to efficiency, with regulations enforcing some standards. Efficiency became a selling point, both to save on running costs and to reduce carbon dioxide emissions associated with energy generation, and waste of water.

As energy and water efficiency became regulated, they became a selling point for buyers; however, the effectiveness of rinsing was not specified, and it did not directly attract the attention of buyers. Therefore, manufacturers tended to reduce the degree of rinsing after washing, saving water and electrical energy. This had the side-effect of leaving more detergent residue in clothes, which can affect people with allergies or sensitivity. In response to complaints, some manufacturers have now designed their machines with a user-selectable option for additional rinsing.

=== Europe ===
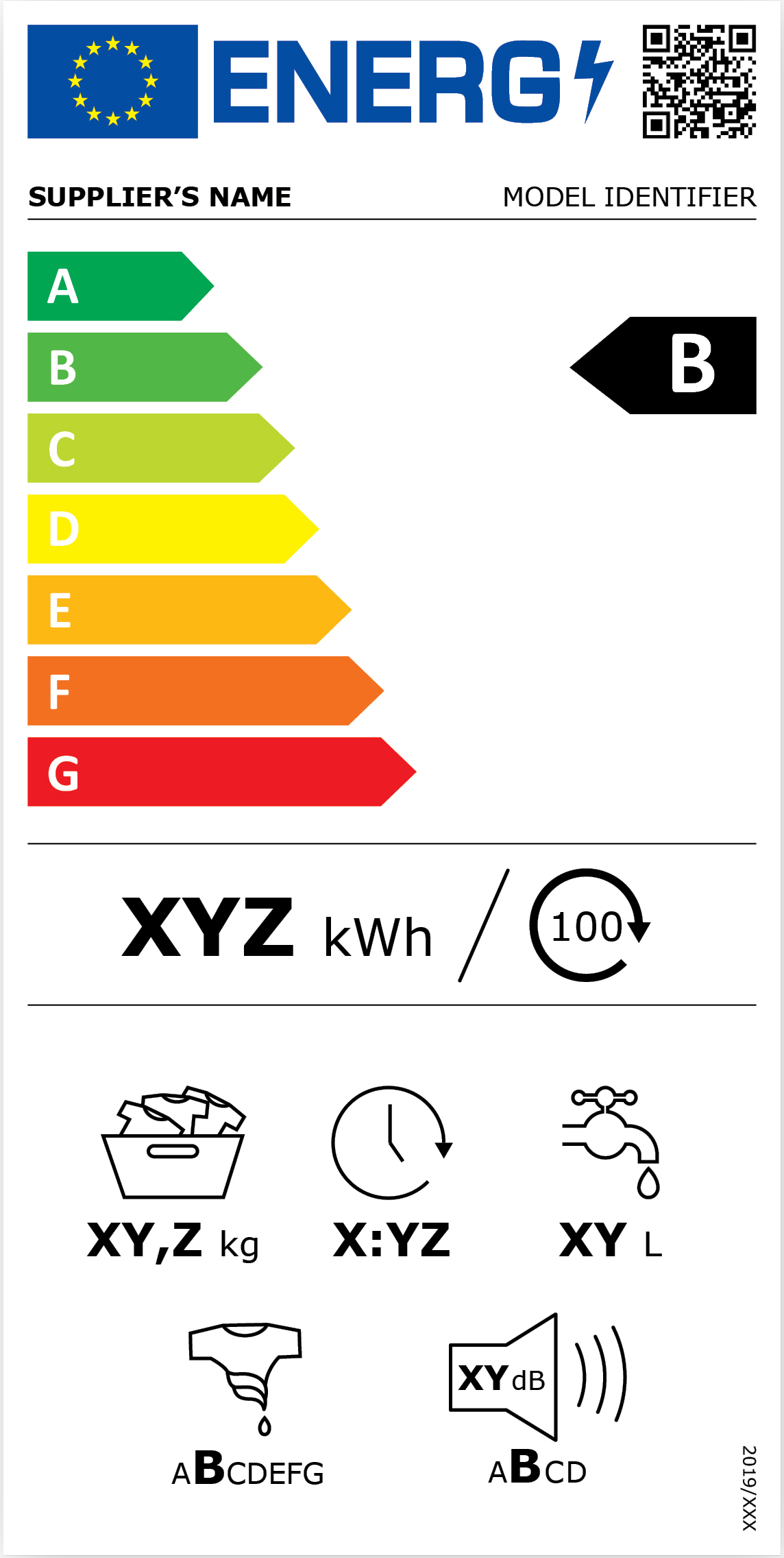
The EU requires that washing machines carry an efficiency label.

Washing machines display an EU Energy Label with grades for energy efficiency, washing performance, and spin efficiency. Grades for energy efficiency run from A to G (best to worst), providing a simple method for judging running costs. Washing performance and spin efficiency are graded in the range A to G. However, all machines for sale must have washing performance A, so that manufacturers cannot compromise washing performance in order to improve the energy efficiency. This labeling has had the desired effect of driving customers toward more efficient washing machines and away from less efficient ones.

According to regulations, each washing machine is equipped with a wastewater filter. This ensures that no hazardous chemical substances are disposed of improperly through the sewage system; on the other hand, it also ensures that if there is backflow in the plumbing system, sewage cannot enter the washing machine.

=== United States ===
Top-loading and front-loading clothes washers are covered by a single national standard regulating energy consumption. The old federal standards applicable before January 2011 did not restrict water consumption; there was no limit on how much unheated rinse water could be used. Energy consumption for clothes washers is quantified using the energy factor.

After new mandatory federal standards were introduced, many US washers were manufactured to be more energy- and water-efficient than required by the federal standard, or even than required by the more-stringent Energy Star standard. Manufacturers were further motivated to exceed mandatory standards by a program of direct-to-manufacturer tax credits.

In North America, the Energy Star program compares and lists energy-efficient clothes washers. Certified Energy Star units can be compared by their Modified Energy Factor (MEF) and Water Factor (WF) coefficients.

The MEF figure of merit states how many cubic feet (about 28.3 liters) of clothes are washed per kWh (kilowatt hour). The coefficient is influenced by factors including the configuration of the washer (top-loading, front-loading), its spin speed, and the temperatures and the amount of water used in the rinse and wash cycles.

Energy Star residential clothes washers must have an MEF of at least 2.0 (the higher the better); the best machines may reach 3.5. Energy Star washers must also have a WF of less than 6.0 (the lower the better).

== Commercial use ==
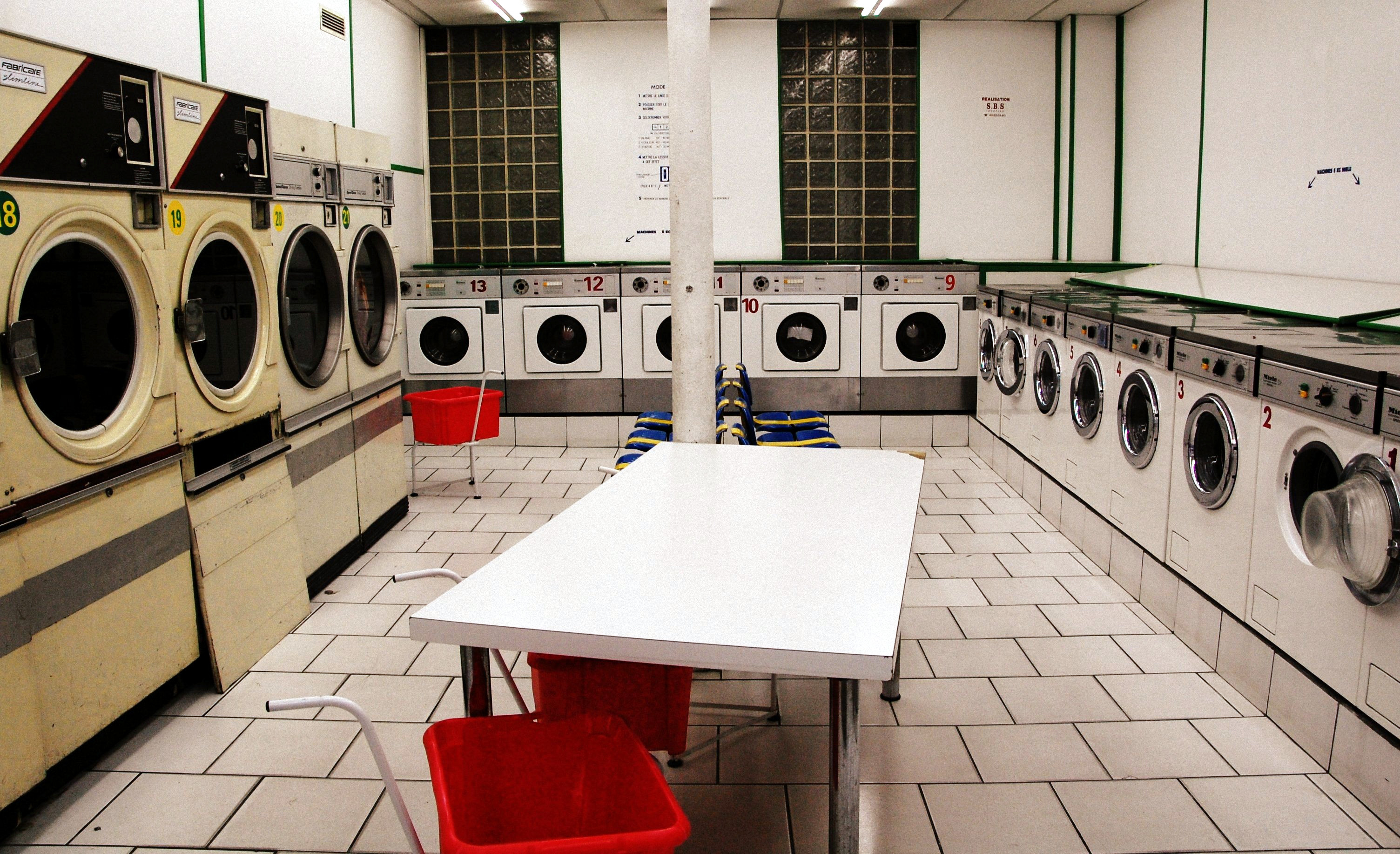
Commercial washing machines and dryers (at left) in a self-service laundry (Paris, France)

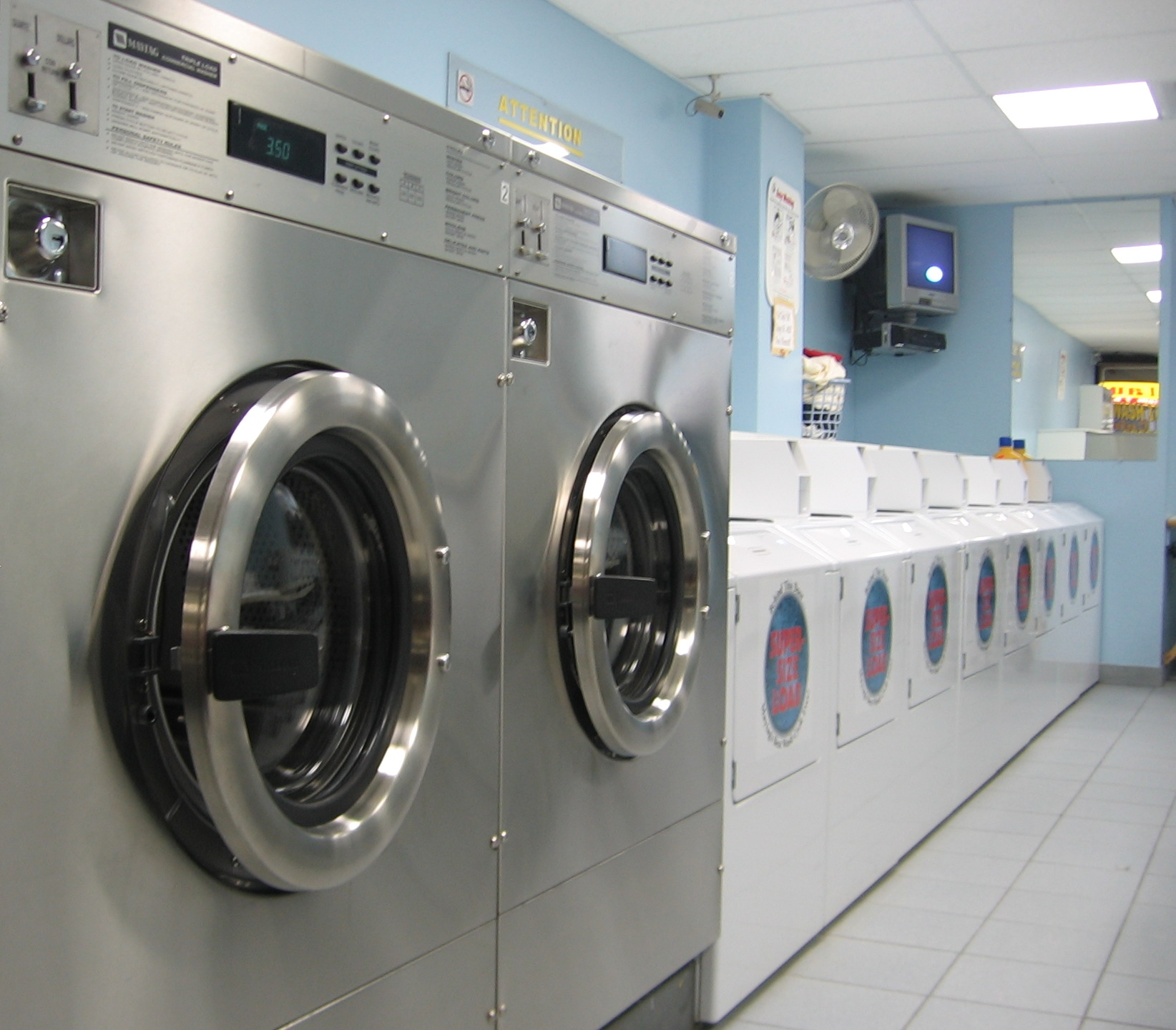
Commercial washing machines in a self-service laundromat (Toronto, Canada)

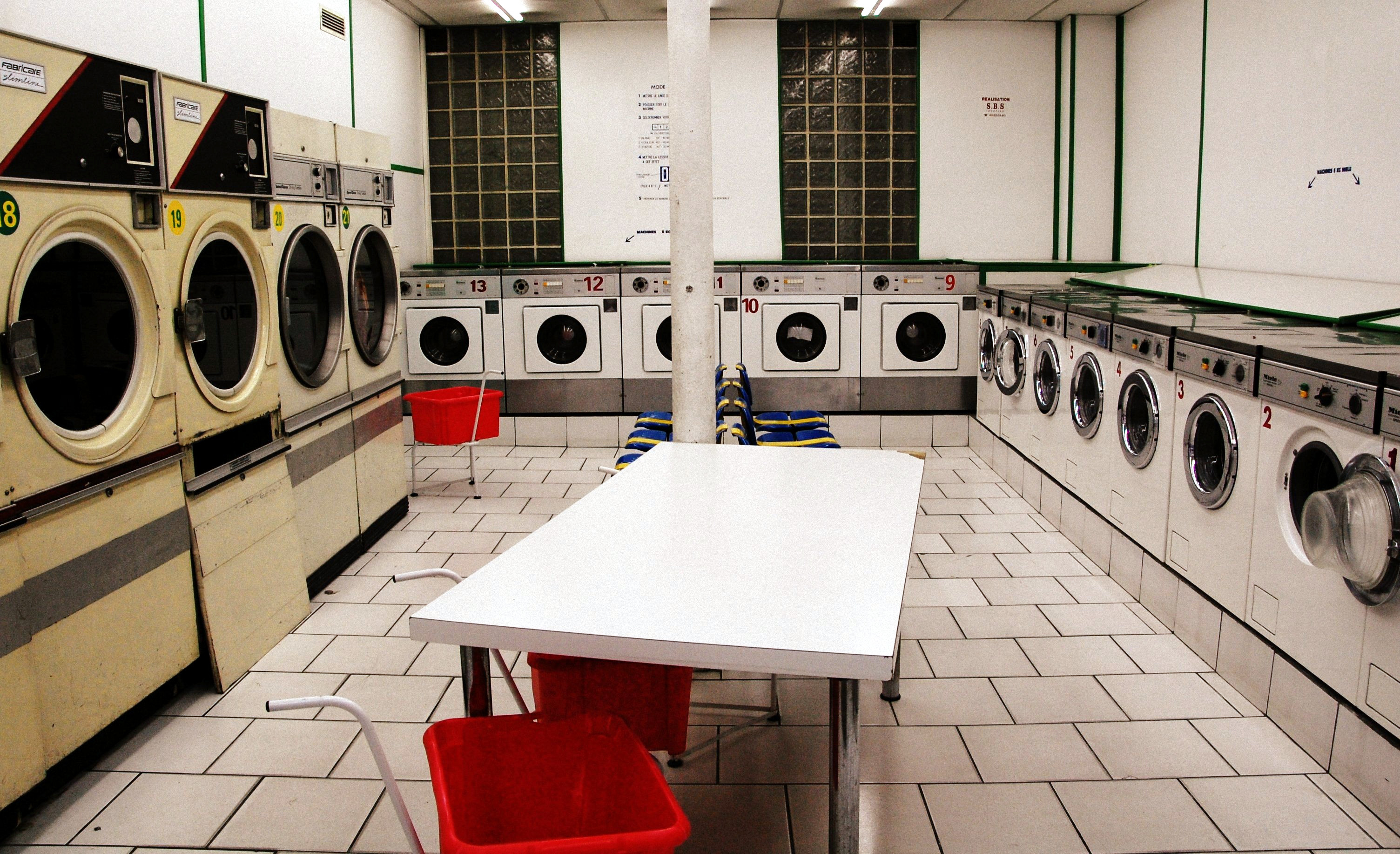
Commercial washing machines and dryers in a self-service laundry in Paris, France

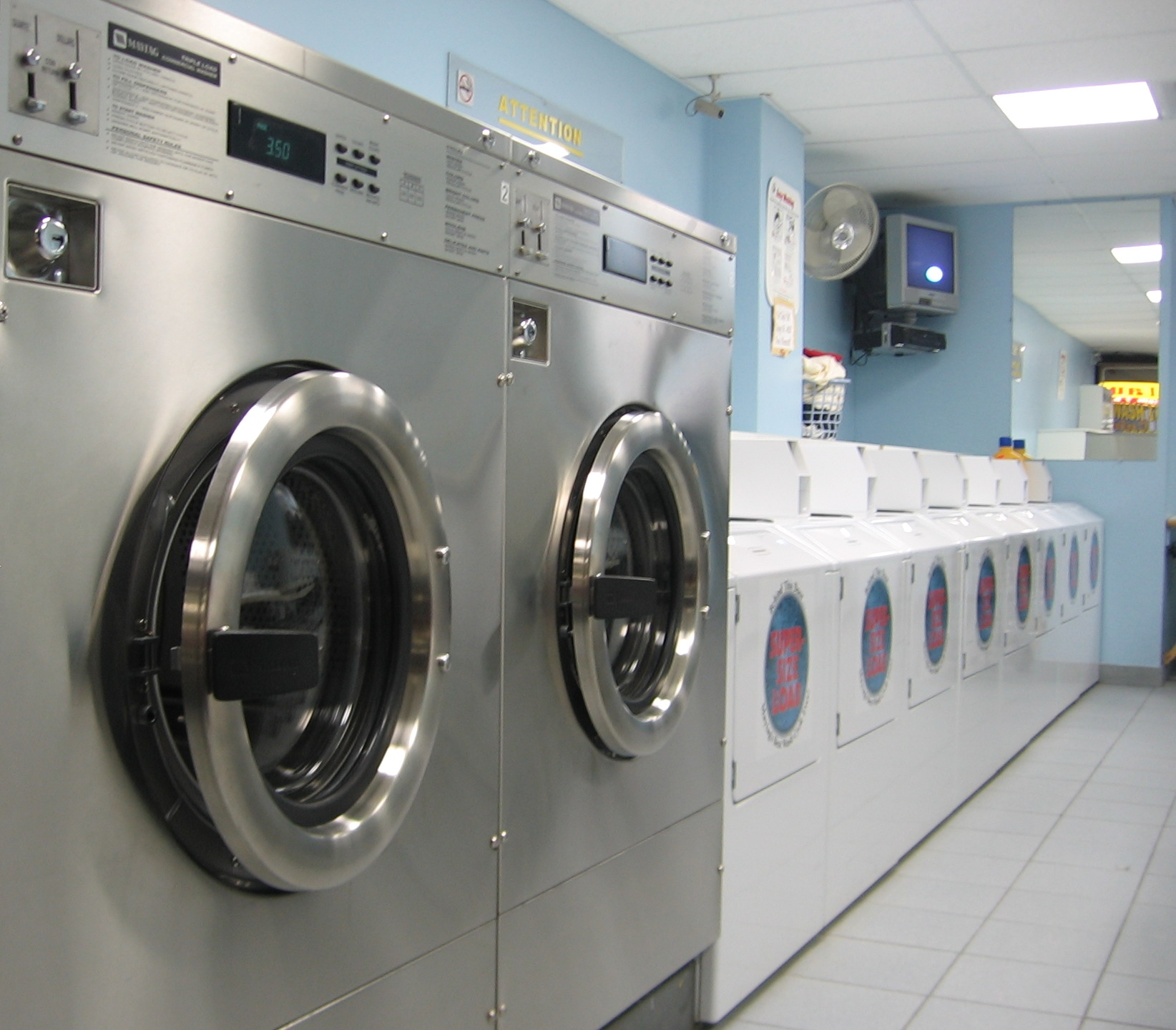
Commercial washing machines in a self-service laundromat in Toronto, Canada

Commercial laundry equipment includes single-load washing machines used in self-service laundries, multi-load machines, washer-extractors used in institutional and industrial laundries, and continuous-batch tunnel washers. In the United States, the Department of Energy defines a commercial clothes washer as a soft-mounted front-loading or top-loading clothes washer within specified capacity limits that is designed for shared multi-household use or other commercial applications.

== Laundromat machines ==
Self-service laundromats commonly use coin- or card-operated single-load and multi-load commercial washing machines. Multi-load machines may be either top-loading or front-loading and may use hard-mounted or soft-mounted designs. Some have capacities of up to approximately 80 lb (36 kg) per load. Commercial coin- and card-operated machines may use one or two wash cycles and one or two rinse cycles for each load. The number of cycles and the volume of water used vary by machine and program. Front-loading machines generally use less water and energy than conventional top-loading agitator machines. Drainage systems vary according to machine design and installation requirements. Commercial front-loading washing machines may therefore use different drainage arrangements rather than a single drainage method.

== Industrial washers ==
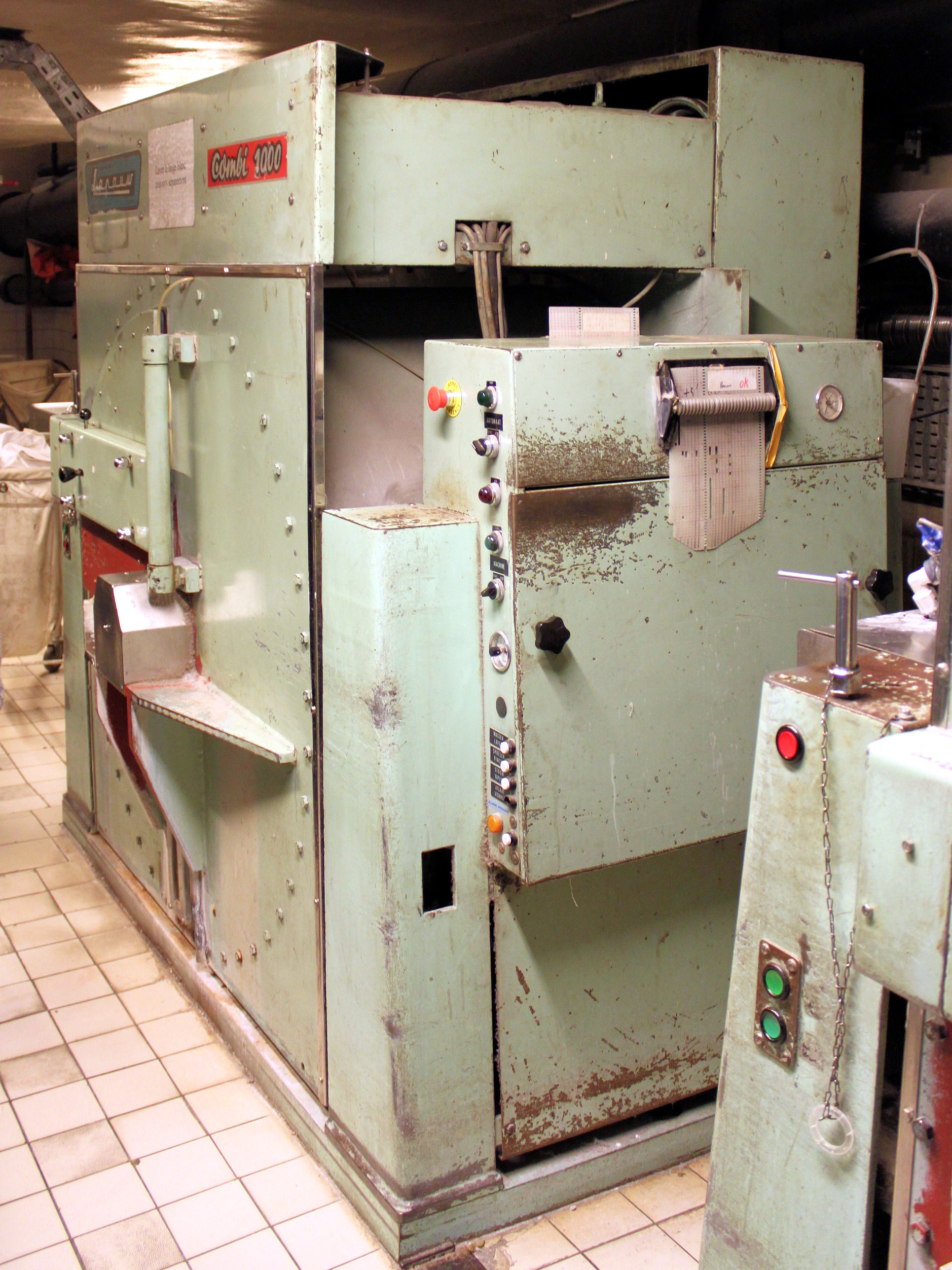
A 1980s Belgian 90 kg industrial washer with a horizontal-axis, front-loading design

On-premises laundries in hotels, hospitals, nursing homes, prisons, universities, and similar facilities commonly use multi-load washing machines and washer-extractors. Industrial contract laundries also use such equipment. Washer-extractors may have capacities ranging from approximately 30 lb (14 kg) to 800 lb (363 kg) per load. They use centrifugal extraction to remove water from textiles after washing. Industrial washer-extractors may use more complex wash sequences than coin- or card-operated machines. Depending on the textiles and degree of soiling, programs may include washing, bleaching, rinsing, and adjustment of pH. Water levels and the proportions of hot and cold water may also vary between stages. A tunnel washer, also known as a continuous-batch washer, is used in large institutional and industrial laundries. A tunnel washer consists of a long chamber divided into compartments through which laundry passes during soaking, washing, and rinsing. Depending on the installation, tunnel washers may process up to approximately 2,000 lb (907 kg) of laundry per hour. Many tunnel systems use counter-flowing water, in which water moves in the opposite direction to the laundry and is reused during successive stages of the washing process.

== Social impact ==
Household laundry was historically a time-consuming form of domestic work. The adoption of washing machines and other household appliances has been studied as part of the wider development of labor-saving household technology. Greenwood, Seshadri and Yorukoglu argued that the spread of household appliances during the twentieth century reduced the labor required for household production and contributed to increased participation by married women in paid employment. Cavalcanti and Tavares found an association between declining prices of household appliances and increased female labor-force participation across countries. Research using household-level data from the United States has also found evidence that the adoption of household appliances, including washing machines, contributed to increased labor-force participation among married women during the twentieth century. A study in Nigeria found a positive association between washing-machine ownership and female labor-force participation. Research on a household-appliance subsidy program in rural China found that increased ownership of durable household appliances was associated with reductions in time spent on housework and increases in women's market work and labor-force participation. The relationship between household technology and participation in paid employment varies according to economic conditions, household structure, location, and historical period.

== Environmental impact ==
The environmental impact of washing machines varies according to energy and water consumption, washing temperature, load size, detergent use, frequency of operation, electricity generation, and appliance lifespan. Life-cycle studies have identified the use phase as a major component of the environmental impact associated with clothes washing. Cullen and Allwood found that the energy consumed during the operation of washing machines accounted for a substantial proportion of energy use in several life-cycle studies of clothing, detergents, and washing machines. Heating water can account for a substantial proportion of washing-related energy consumption. A life-cycle study of residential water-using appliances found that water heating accounted for 73 percent of the water-related energy demand associated with the washing machine examined in the study. Greenhouse-gas emissions associated with washing vary between countries and households. A study covering 23 European countries estimated an average of approximately 0.5 kg (1.1 lb) of carbon-dioxide equivalent per wash in 2014. Differences were attributed to factors including electricity-generation mix, washing temperature, machine energy use, and consumer behaviour. Energy-efficiency standards and labelling requirements have reduced the energy and water consumption of household washing machines. European Union ecodesign requirements also include provisions relating to the availability of spare parts and appliance reparability. The environmental effects of replacing an older washing machine depend on the efficiency and remaining service life of the existing appliance, the efficiency of the replacement, electricity consumption, and the environmental impacts associated with manufacturing and disposal.

== See also ==
- Centrifugation
- Laundry
- Clothes dryer
- Washer-dryer
- Detergent
- Drying cabinet
- Electrical efficiency
- Home appliance
- Ironing
- Laundry detergent
- Laundry symbol
- Laundry-folding machine
- Major appliance
- Silver Nano
- Trap
- Thor washing machine
- L'Increvable
