= L'Increvable =

Washing machine made to last 50 years

L'Increvable is the name given to the washing machine built to last 50 years and created by the French designer Julien Phedyaeff. It is a device that comes as an assembly kit.

== History and description of the machine ==
According to Phedyaeff, the idea dates back to 2013, during his master's thesis on 'extended research on object dismantling practises'. He made a report that detailed how spare parts, when available, were sold at exceedingly high prices. His invention is designed to be delivered in kit from 'a healthy, solid and improvable base'. In order for it to be lighter, the washing machine lacks a concrete ballast. It is replaced by a reservoir which fills with water during the first use. The machine originally was a project presented for his diploma at the École Nationale Supérieure de Création Industrielle which he obtained in June 2014. The project received congratulations from the jury and obtained a label from 'l'Observeur du design 2015'.

On December 18, 2020, L'Increvable SAS closed down.

== Awards ==
- A label from 'l'Observeur du design' 2015
