= Whirlpool plant =

Whirlpool plant is the name of a number of manufacturing plants across the United States operation by Whirlpool Corporation; some Whirlpool plants were acquired from Maytag in 2006:

- Clyde, Ohio: Whirlpool Clyde plant (1952–present)
- Marion, Ohio: Whirlpool Marion plant (1955–present)
- Amana, Iowa: Whirlpool Amana plant (1934–present; former Amana plant operated by Maytag until 2006)
- Evansville, Indiana: Whirlpool Evansville plant (1956–2010)
- Fort Smith, Arkansas: Whirlpool Fort Smith plant (1962–2012)
- Tulsa, Oklahoma: Whirlpool Tulsa plant (1996–present)
- Oxford, Mississippi: Whirlpool Oxford plant (1963–2009)
- Cleveland, Tennessee: Whirlpool Cleveland plant (1916–present; former Magic Chef plant operated by Maytag until 2006)
- Greenville, Ohio: Whirlpool Greenville plant (1942–present; former KitchenAid plant operated by Hobart Corporation)
- Findlay, Ohio: Whirlpool Findlay plant (1967–present)
- La Vergne, Tennessee: Whirlpool La Vergne plant (c.1987–2008)
- Benton Harbor, Michigan: Whirlpool Benton Harbor plant (1956–2011)
- Ottawa, Ohio: Whirlpool Ottawa plant (1990–present)
- Fall River, Massachusetts: Whirlpool Fall River plant (1965–present)
- Racine, Wisconsin: Whirlpool Racine plant (1938–present)
