= Chambers stove =

Defunct American appliance brand

Chambers Corporation
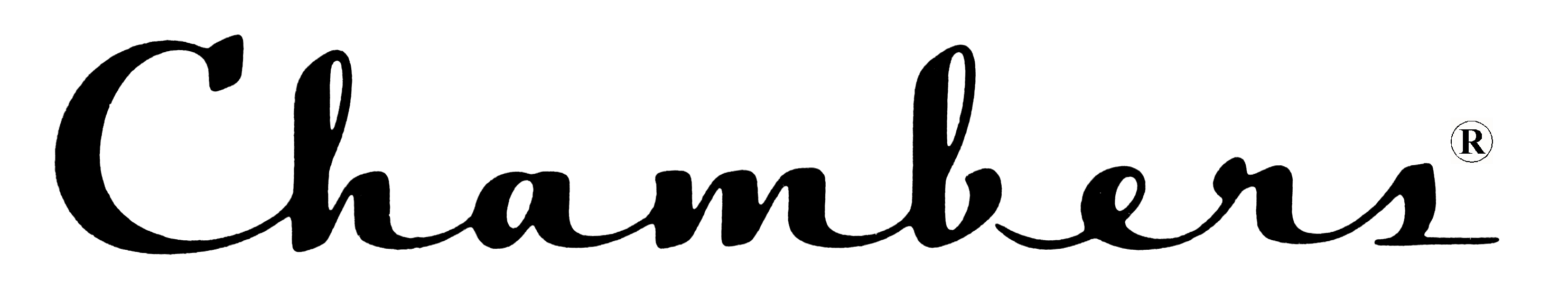
- Type: Defunct
- Industry: Appliances
- Founded: 1910
- Fate: Closed down in c. 1988
- Headquarters: Shelbyville, Indiana, United States
- Products: gas stoves, electric stoves, built-in electric and gas cooktops and ovens, kitchen hoods, dishwashers

The Chambers stove is a generic name for several different kitchen cooking appliances sold under the Chambers brand name from 1912 to approximately 1988. Their ranges and stand-alone ovens were known for their patented insulation methods, which enabled them to cook on retained heat with the fuel turned off.

== History ==
The Chambers Fireless Gas Range was a gas cook stove created by John E. Chambers in 1910, Two years after inventing his fireless cooker, John Chambers organized the Chambers Company in 1912. Chambers' patented method of manufacture used thick rock wool insulation to insulate the oven on all sides. This made it possible for the heat inside the oven to build up over a short period of time. The gas was then turned off, causing a series of internal dampers to close, which effectively isolated the oven compartment from the outside air. The food would continue to cook on retained heat, thus conserving fuel and reducing food shrinkage. This method of cooking, Chambers literature often claimed, also increased the food value of the cooked items.

The Chambers Corporation manufactured successive versions of this design in Shelbyville, Indiana, from 1912 through January, 1955.

Chambers Corporation was sold by the Chambers family in 1950 to the Flato brothers, who were the Chambers distributors in Houston, Texas. The Rangaire company purchased Chambers in 1964, and operated it out of the Oxford, Mississippi, plant built by the Flato brothers in 1963 until 1983, when they sold it to the KitchenAid Division of the Hobart Corporation. During Rangaire's ownership of the Chambers Corporation, manufacture of the famous insulated range continued into the 1970s. In 1986, KitchenAid was sold to Whirlpool. By the early 1990s, Chambers-branded appliances were no longer being manufactured.

In 2007, the Thor Corporation of Los Angeles resurrected the Chambers brand name.

The earliest Chambers ranges were small, but all were constructed of cast iron, heavy gauge steel and porcelain enamel. All models were thickly insulated using rock wool insulation, which enabled their owners to use them like an ordinary range or cook using retained heat. To help owners of their products learn the proper use of the retained heat cooking feature of their ranges, Chambers developed a large home economics department in their Shelbyville, Indiana, factory. There, recipes and cooking times using the insulated properties of their products were carefully tested and perfected. These tests resulted in charts which indicated the amount of time - and at what temperature - the gas was to be burned in the oven and the Thermodome (which was succeeded by the Thermowell), before it was to be turned off completely while the food continued to cook on retained heat. By 1927, Chambers published a cookbook for the homemaker to not only help her learn how to care for and operate the appliance, but also to assist her in menu planning, proper table setting, etc. This publication was called The Idle Hour Cookbook. The Idle Hour Cookbook was replaced in the late 1960s by Rangaire with an actual operation manual.

The most updated version of these was the C-series. Up to the early 1930s, Chambers offered up to two dozen different models for different size homes. In 1935, Chambers built its final large, industrial-sized units, called the Imperial line, for use in hotels, restaurants, dormitory kitchens, tea rooms, road houses, large homes, etc.

All residential Chambers ranges beginning with what is now referred to as the A-series (circa 1936) had a top-mounted griddle/broiler. Most models came with a recessed slow cooker called a Thermowell (descendant of the earlier Thermodome) for cooking soups, stews, etc., using special aluminum kettles designed and built for Chambers by the Wearever Corporation. The Thermowell was completely redesigned for the model C for improved performance. With a special accessory called a Thermobaker, it could even be used as a second oven.

In 2015, the Chambers brand was purchased by J.A.K. North America Inc. in Canada, and licensed by J.A.K. North America Inc. in the U.S. They released Chambers branded refrigerators with retro stylings.

== Features ==
While not all models had all the following features, most of the more commonly sold Chambers ranges included:

- Basket-style oven racks.
- Built-in lights.
- Child-protective locking thumb-latches on all gas valves.
- Chrome-Plated cooktop, which Chambers called "Durachrome".
- Full porcelain finishes - guaranteed by the factory for 25 years.
- Heat from Range vented out through the backsplash, enabling it to be set flush to the wall
- Mechanical Timer, which Chambers called a "Minute Minder".
- Multi-fuel design - able to operate on natural gas, propane, butane.
- Patented "daisy" burners - efficient and uniform in their distribution of heat.
- Some of the first built-in ovens and cooktops (early 1950s) made in America.
- Teardrop design gas handles.
- The use of "ThermalEye" (1950s) - developed by Robertshaw and marketed by Chambers as "The Burner With A Brain", this device made it possible to set the desired cooking temperature of a pot that had been placed on the special burner on the top of the range, and the heat would be regulated automatically.
- Thermobaker insert for the Thermowell - enabled baking of small items and meals in the Thermowell.
- Thermowell - a built-in slow cooker, similar in function to a crockpot.
- Top Burner Pilot - could be used as a warming burner.
- Utility (Service) Cabinet - designed for access to the inner mechanisms and gas pipes of the range, and for storage of pots, pans, and Thermowell kettles. Misunderstood by some to be a warming oven.
- Wide grates designed to accommodate any size cooking utensil.

== Popularity ==
Famous owners of Chambers ranges included Lee DeForest and Mrs. Harvey W. Wiley, well-known American housewife in the 1920s. A Chambers oven can also be found in the home of the late Sam Rayburn.

The Chambers Range was awarded the Good Housekeeping Institute's Seal of Approval in 1925, was awarded the Grand Prize and Gold Medal for distinguished service at the International Exposition in Paris, France, 1937, and was featured at the World's Fair Exposition of 1939 in New York City.

Demand for refurbished Chambers stoves remains high - some of the Imperial models have been restored and sold for prices up to US$17,000, though selling prices of unrestored residential models is far less. Increased interest in the Chambers Range may be due to its exposure on the televised cooking show of Rachael Ray.

Websites for fans of vintage Chambers products have been developed in order to provide general information about them to those on the internet. Links to service technicians, sources for parts, as well as operational literature may also be found there. Also helpful are the pictorial documentaries on the restoration of Chambers ranges by their owners. In addition to websites such as these, at least two active Internet Forums exist for those interested in older Chambers products. There, people can find recipes, repair tips, cooking techniques, and restoration advice.

== Gallery ==
Chambers Fireless Model from 1920s

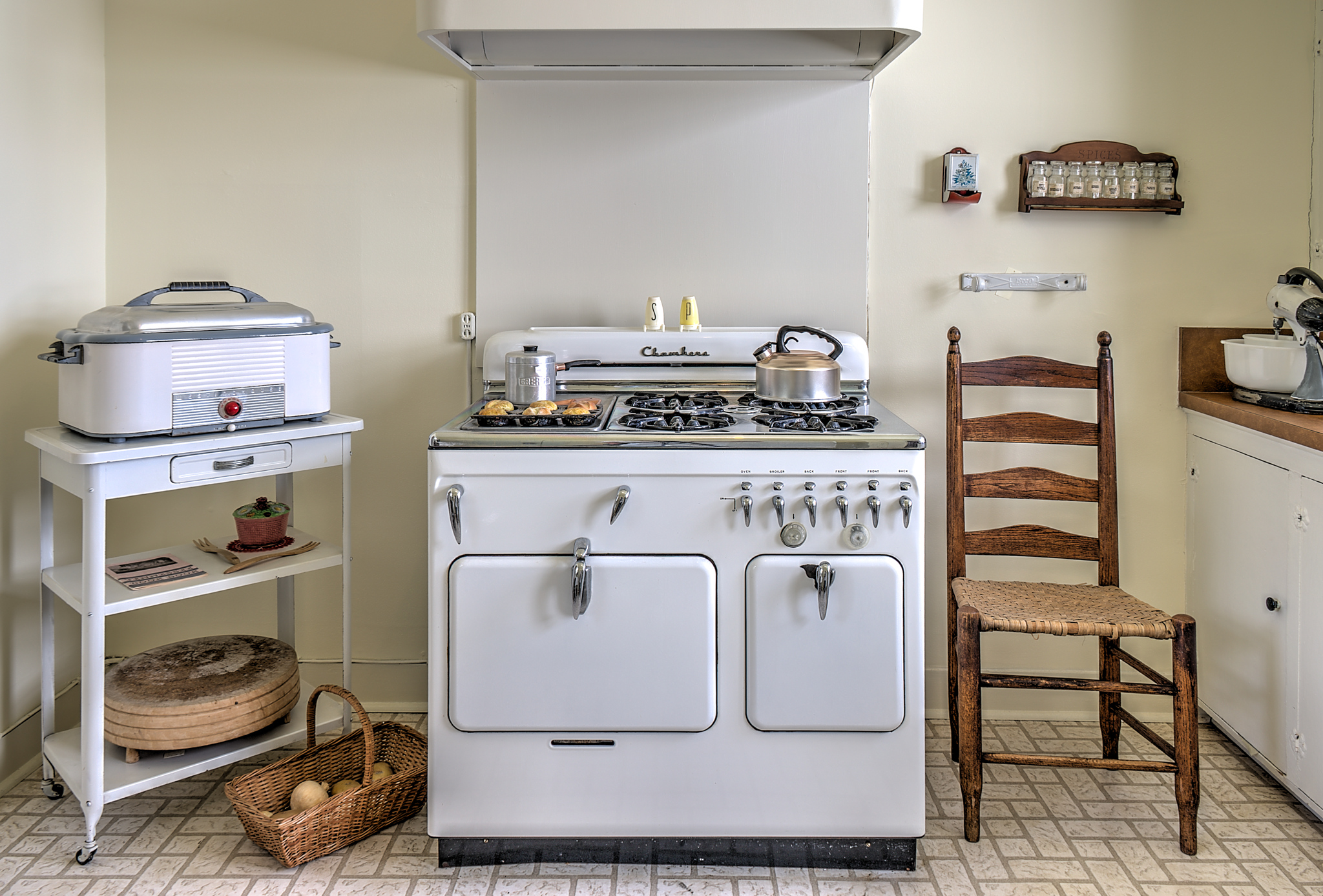
Chambers oven at the Sam Rayburn House Museum

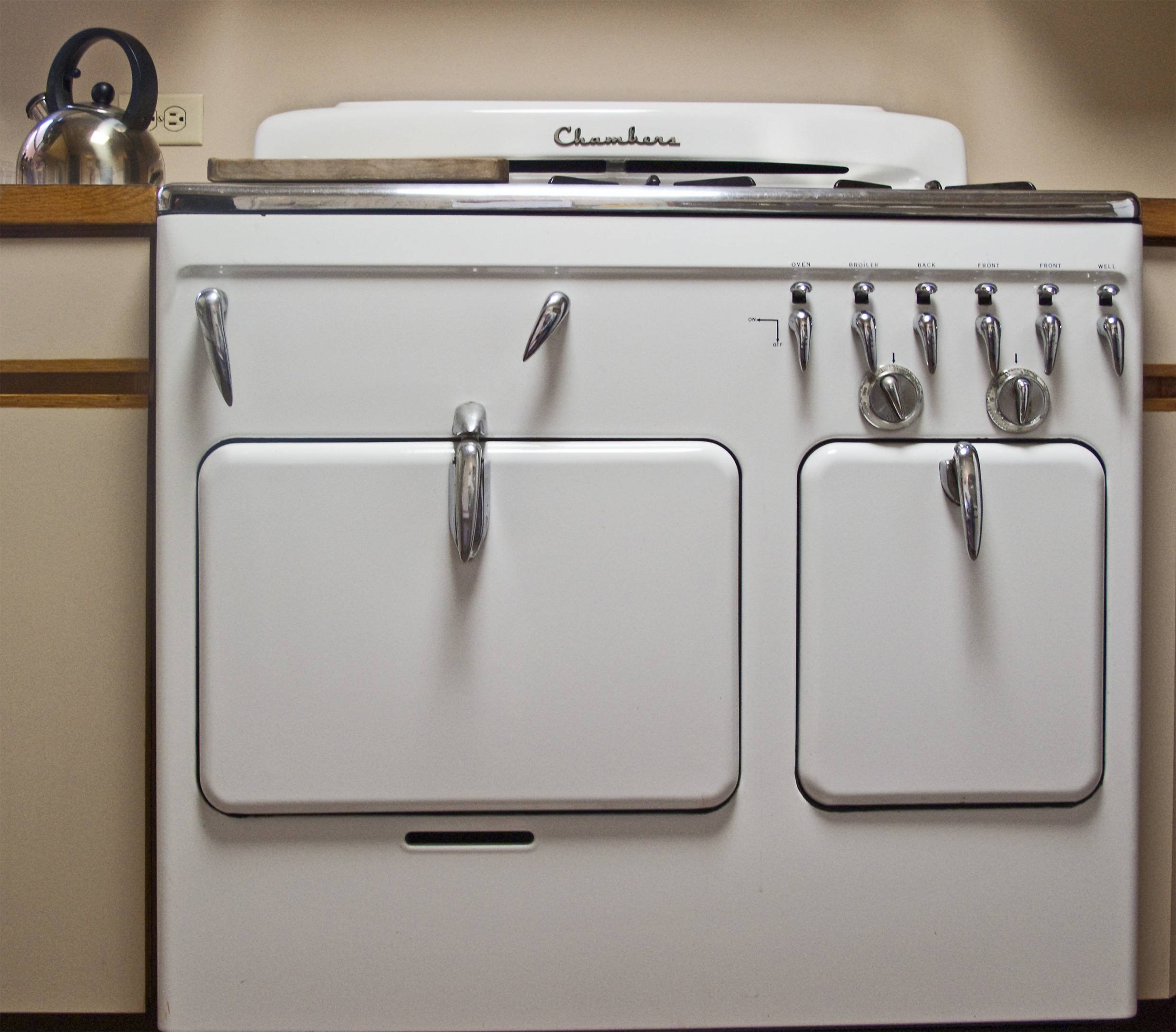
Vintage Chambers stove

== See also ==
- List of stoves
