= Whirlpool Benton Harbor plant =

- Operated: 1956–2011
- Location: 151 Riverview Drive; Benton Harbor, Michigan, United States
- Coordinates: 42°6′55″N 86°27′57″W
- Industry: Home appliances
- Products: laundry parts
- Employees: 216 (2010)
- Area: 100 acres (40 ha)
- Owner: Whirlpool Corporation

Whirlpool Benton Harbor plant, known as Plant 7, was an appliance manufacturing plant in Benton Harbor, Michigan, owned by Whirlpool Corporation. The 1915-built plant was closed in 2011, shifting parts production to Clyde, Ohio.

== History ==
The plant was opened in 1956 when the company opened its 100-acre administrative and manufacturing center.

In 1986, Whirlpool announced plans to close four of its manufacturing facilities in the St. Joseph, Michigan area, including a laundry manufacturing plant in St. Joseph that was closed in October of that year, shifting production to two non-union plants in Ohio; Clyde and Marion. This leaves the parts plant in Benton Harbor the only one in the St. Joseph, Michigan area.

In June 2010, Whirlpool announced that it will close the Benton Harbor, Michigan, parts manufacturing plant by early 2011, terminating 216 workers, moving parts production to a facility in Clyde, Ohio. After the closure of the Benton Harbor plant, Whirlpool transitioned the 100-acre center into the Benton Harbor Tech Center (completed in 2016), a $155-plus million, 170,000-square-foot technology, refrigeration lab, and office campus.
