= InSinkErator Racine plant =

- Operated: 1938–present
- Location: 4700 21st Street; Racine, Wisconsin, United States
- Coordinates: 42°42′20″N 87°50′14″W
- Industry: Home appliances
- Products: InSinkErator products
- Employees: 1,000
- Volume: 450,000 square feet (42,000 m^{2})
- Owner: Whirlpool Corporation

InSinkErator Racine plant is a InSinkErator appliance manufacturing plant in Racine, Wisconsin, owned by Whirlpool Corporation.

== History ==
In 1938, InSinkErator was founded by John W. Hammes, and in 1968, the plant (and the company) was purchased by Emerson Electric.

In 2014, Emerson announced a $65 million regional project, which included investing $43.7 million to buy new equipment and renovate the Racine manufacturing plant. Emerson announced in August 2016 it would transition the InSinkErator plant on 21st Street in Racine, Wisconsin, into an assembly-only operation. This change shifted motor production, shaft machining, and die casting away from the site to free up space and manage high consumer demand.

In 2017, the company launched an additional $63 million investment package, which included spending $34 million to build a new 85,000-square-foot headquarters and lab facility in neighboring Mount Pleasant, Wisconsin. This project moved 175 engineers and professional staff out of the main Racine manufacturing site into the dedicated Mount Pleasant building, clearing more internal room for factory line activities.

On November 1, 2022, Whirlpool acquired InSinkErator from Emerson Electric, including its plant in Racine, Wisconsin.
