= Whirlpool Oxford plant =

- Operated: 1963–2009
- Location: 927 Whirlpool Drive; Oxford, Mississippi, United States
- Coordinates: 34°21′16″N 89°32′31″W
- Industry: Home appliances
- Products: built-in ovens; cooktops; slide-in ranges; freestanding ranges
- Employees: 750 (2008)
- Area: 68 acres (28 ha)
- Volume: 500,000 sq ft (46,000 m^{2})
- Owner: Whirlpool Corporation

Whirlpool Oxford plant was an appliance manufacturing plant in Oxford, Mississippi owned by Whirlpool Corporation.

== History ==
The Oxford, Mississippi manufacturing facility was opened in 1963 by the Flato brothers, who were Chambers Corporation distributors, to manufacture insulated ranges. Chambers was acquired in 1964 by Rangaire, when the company sold the business in 1983 to the Hobart Corporation, owner of KitchenAid, and in 1986, Hobart sold KitchenAid to Whirlpool.

In 1996, Whirlpool invested $20 million to expand its manufacturing plant. In 2004, a $10 million investment upgraded the Oxford, Mississippi, Whirlpool facility to expand its production of built-in cooking appliances. This project added about 150 jobs to the facility. Also in the same year, the Oxford plant began producing cooking appliances for the Canadian market along with the Tulsa, Oklahoma plant, following the closure of the company's plant in Montmagny, Quebec.

In July 2008, Whirlpool announced the closure of its manufacturing plant in Oxford, Mississippi, terminating 750 workers, shifting production to a former Maytag plant in Cleveland, Tennessee. The plant closed on April 9, 2009, resulting in the loss of about 750 manufacturing jobs and an estimated $20 million annual payroll from the Lafayette County economy. The plant was sold in 2010 and was demolished in 2016.
