= JennAir =

American designer of household appliances

- Type: Subsidiary
- Industry: Household appliances
- Founded: 1947; 79 years ago in Indianapolis, Indiana
- Founder: Louis J. Jenn
- Headquarters: Benton Harbor, Michigan, United States
- Parent: Whirlpool Corporation
- Website: www.jennair.com

JennAir is a Benton Harbor, Michigan-based designer and manufacturer of household appliances and fixtures.

== History ==
The original Jenn-Air Products Company was founded by Louis J. Jenn in Indianapolis, Indiana, in 1947, later becoming simply Jenn-Air. In the early years, the company was focused on manufacturing and marketing of industrial fans for use in a variety of commercial and industrial applications. In 1961, Jenn-Air's integration of one of these fans to a cook-top range led to the invention of the first self-ventilated downdraft range. The company expanded its product line to include many other kitchen appliances including microwave ovens, refrigerators, dishwashers, and small appliances such as mixers and blenders.

== Corporate ownership ==
The Jenn-Air brand was acquired by Maytag Corporation in 1982 which was subsequently purchased by Whirlpool Corporation in 2006.

At the Architectural Digest Design Show in New York City in 2018, Whirlpool announced that the hyphen would be removed from JennAir's name. A new slogan, "Bound by Nothing", and a new logo were also announced at the same time.

JennAir continues as a distinct brand.
