= Matsushita Danville plant =

- Built: 1969–1971
- Operated: 1971–2017
- Location: 1355 Lebanon Road; Danville, Kentucky, United States
- Coordinates: 37°38′7″N 84°47′48″W
- Industry: Home appliances
- Products: vacuum cleaners
- Employees: 700 (1990)
- Area: 60 acres (24 ha)
- Volume: 787,000 square feet (73,100 m^{2})
- Owner: Matsushita

Matsushita Danville plant, operating as Matsushita Home Appliance Company, was an vacuum cleaner manufacturing plant in Danville, Kentucky, owned by Matsushita. The facility produced upright and canister vacuum cleaners, primarily the Kenmore brand for Sears (in addition to Panasonic-branded vacuum cleaners) and was closed in 2017.

== History ==
=== Whirlpool Corporation ===
The facility broke ground by the Whirlpool Corporation in 1969, and was opened in 1971 as a $3 million, 270,000-square foot facility to produce trash compactors, later expanding in 1972 to include electric motors for refrigerators and freezers. In 1974, the plant began manufacturing icemakers.

In 1983, Whirlpool broke ground on its $3 million, 52,800-square-foot addition to its Danville plant to expand production into vacuum cleaners. In 1984, Whirlpool began producing vacuum cleaners at the plant (including those from Sears' Kenmore brand), relocating production from the closed St. Paul, Minnesota, manufacturing plant; a further 51,000-square-foot addition was also opened in 1985 for design and engineering teams. Whirlpool produced its 20 millionth vacuum cleaner there in 1989.

=== Matsushita Electric ===
In February 1990, Whirlpool put its floor care business and its 1,000-worker vacuum cleaner manufacturing plant in Danville, Kentucky, up for sale to focus on core major appliances. In July of this year, Whirlpool and Japan's Matsushita Electric Industrial Company announced a joint venture called Matsushita Floor Care Company, which retained floor care production at the plant. Trash compactors and icemakers that was produced at the plant were moved to other Whirlpool facilities.

In 1995, Matsushita later fully took over the Danville manufacturing plant from Whirlpool. On September 12, 2000, Matsushita filed a WARN notice in Danville, Kentucky, reporting a mass layoff affecting approximately 480 employees at its Lebanon Road plant.

In late 2000, the company opened a new vacuum cleaner manufacturing plant in Monterrey, Mexico. Together with the existing Danville, Kentucky plant, this new Monterrey plant helped produce roughly 600,000 units annually, primarily supplying Sears department stores under an original equipment manufacturing agreement.

In January 2017, Panasonic announced it would shut down its vacuum cleaner manufacturing plant in Danville, Kentucky, by the end of March of that year, and lay off its remaining employees at the plant, as part of a plant to end its North American vacuum cleaner production. The manufacturing plant in Apodaca, near Monterrey, Mexico, shifted its operations away from vacuum cleaners starting in April 2017 to produce car seat warmers and other automotive equipment instead.
