= Royalstar =

Chinese home appliance brand

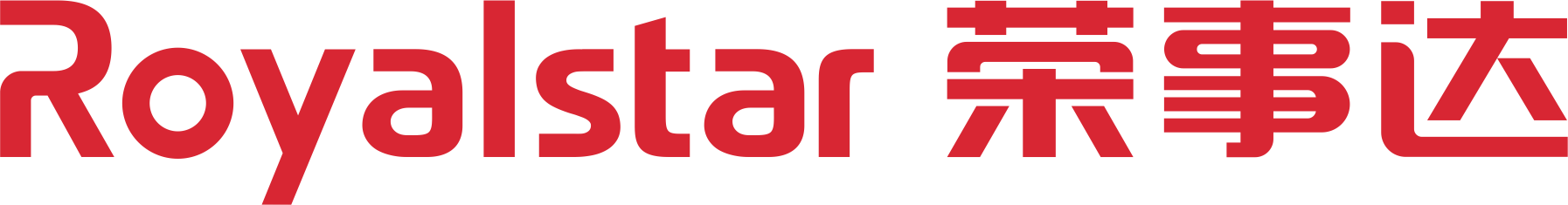
- Product type: Home appliances
- Current owner: Rongdian Group
- Country: China
- Introduced: 1993; 33 years ago
- Website: www.rsdgroup.com.cn

Royalstar (simplified Chinese: 荣事达; traditional Chinese: 榮事達), also known as Rongshida, or simply referred to as RSD, is a Chinese appliance maker. The brand is headquartered in Hefei and is currently owned by Rongdian Group. In 1996, it formed a joint venture with Maytag, which divested the business in 2002.

In the 1990s, Rongshida was one of the top ten well-known consumer brands in China. Since the 21st century, the brand has experienced ups and downs and lost its leading position in the Chinese market of major appliances. In 2011, the liquidation and cancellation of Rongshida as a corporate entity was finished. The Chinese Household Electrical Appliance Network said that after several changes of ownership, the Rongshida brand ceases to exist except in name.

== History ==
The history of Rongshida dates back to 1954. In 1993, the Rongshida brand was officially launched. In 1994, Rongshida Group set up a joint venture with Sanyo Electric Co., Ltd. under the name of Rongshida Sanyo Electric.

In 2013, the Rongshida brand began to be owned by Rongshida Sanyo Electric. Prior to that, the brand had been held by Midea Group for five years.

In 2014, Whirlpool completed its acquisition of a 51% stake in Rongshida Sanyo Electric. The purchase price was approximately $552 million. Subsequently, the company was renamed Whirlpool China.

From 2018 to March 31, 2023, the rights to use the trademark of Rongshida were owned by Whirlpool China.

== Criticism and controversies ==
The brand licensing of "Rongshida" was alleged to be chaotic. Small home appliances such as induction cookers, rice cookers and electric kettles produced by the brand were repeatedly listed on quality inspection blacklists by the Chinese quality inspection authorities.

On May 12, 2016, Alibaba Group launched the "Clean Network Initiative", due to quality problems, Rongshida's small home appliances were banned by Alibaba from being sold on its e-commerce platforms.
