= Louis Upton =

American business magnate

- Born: Louis Cassius Upton; October 10, 1886; Fredonia, New York, U.S.
- Died: October 9, 1952 (aged 65); Niles, Michigan, U.S.
- Known for: Founder of Whirlpool Corporation
- Relatives: Fred Upton (grand-nephew); Kate Upton (great-grand-niece)

Louis Cassius Upton (October 10, 1886 – October 9, 1952) was an American entrepreneur best known for co-founding the Whirlpool Corporation (originally known as Upton Machine Company) with his uncle Emory Upton and investor Lowell Bassford in 1911.

== Early life ==
Louis Cassius Upton was born in Fredonia, New York on October 10, 1886, and was the first of four children of Carrie Upton (née Blogett) and Cassius Marcelus Upton. His father, Cassius was a lawyer by training who founded a publishing business in the late 1890s. Louis had one younger brother, Frederick, and three younger sisters.

In 1903, when Louis was 17 and a junior in high school, his father was killed in a streetcar accident in Chicago. Louis got a job selling insurance to help support the family at the same time that he was completing high school.

== Business career ==
Louis Upton graduated in 1908 from Lake Forest Academy in Lake Forest, Illinois.

=== Early career ===
Upon graduation, Upton attempted to sell insurance to W.S. Klein, the secretary-treasurer of the Commonwealth Edison company. Although Klein did not buy insurance, he was impressed by Upton and offered him a job, which Upton accepted. At Edison, Upton was introduced to the fast-developing field of electricity, and he became obsessed with the idea of making an electric washing machine. In 1908, Upton was approached by E.C. Williams, a hardware merchant in South Bend, Indiana, who wanted to organize a company to manufacture home washers. Williams planned to open a factory in South Bend, and asked Upton to handle the sales department. Williams needed capital, and Upton offered the $500 he had saved. When the firm almost immediately went bankrupt. The owner, E.C. Williams, felt responsible for Louis' loss and told him he could take a patent of his choosing as compensation for his loss. Upton chose a patent on a hand-powered washing machine. He believed the washer could someday have an electric motor attached to it.

=== Fabrication of the electric washer ===
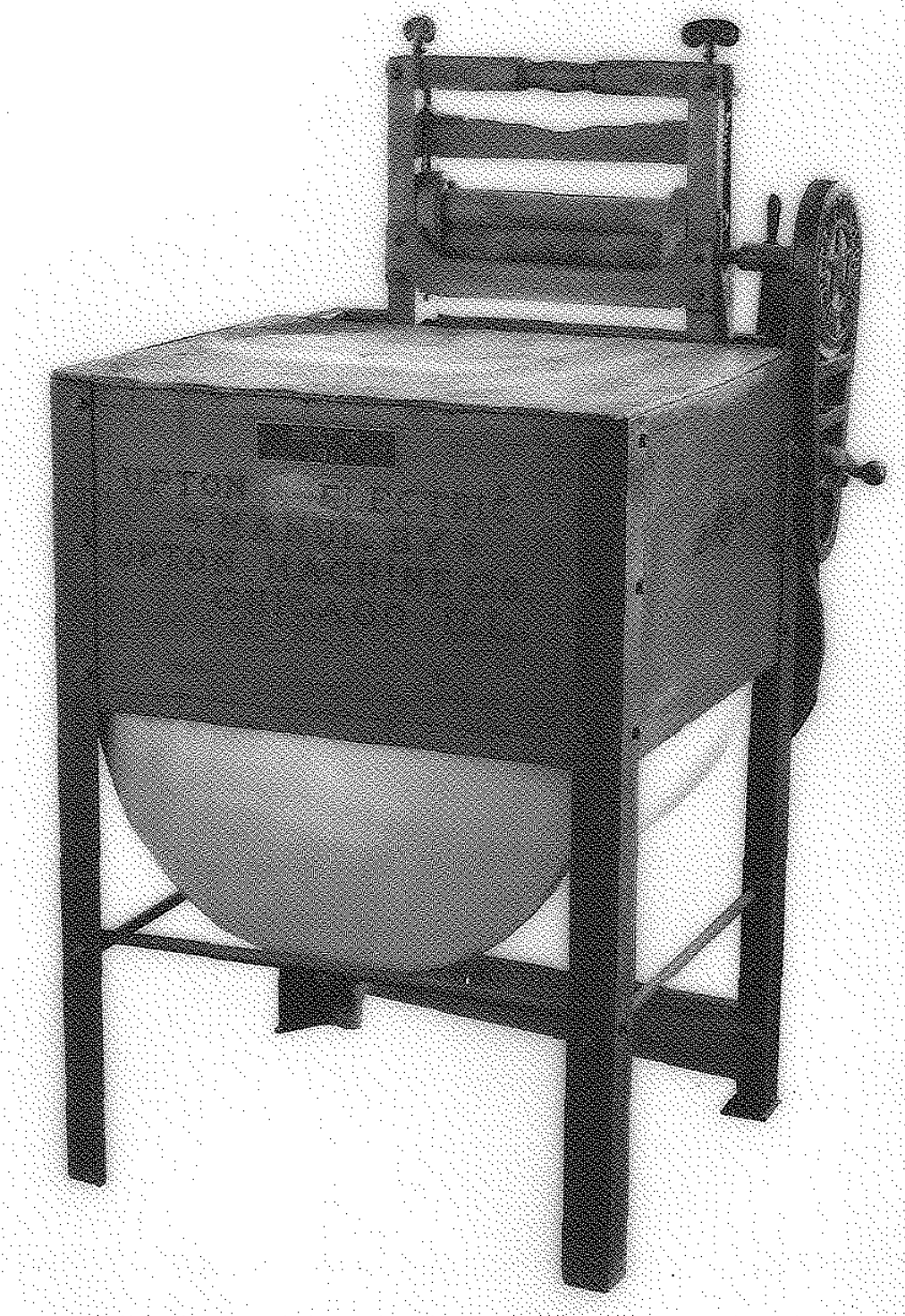
Upton Electric by Upton Machine Co., 1912

Upton was not deterred by the E.C. Williams Manufacturing Co. failure. He took the hand washer patent to his uncle, Emory Upton, a mechanic in Benton Harbor, Michigan, and asked him to motorize it to be powered by electricity. He also returned to his job at Commonwealth Edison. This was not to be the first electric washing machine. Although the first electric washing machine is credited to A.J. Fisher in 1907, there were patents filed for such machines before Fisher's application.

Eventually, Emory Upton built a transmission that worked. Louis Upton took the electric washer to Federal Electric Company, a company affiliated with Commonwealth Edison, and talked them into ordering 100 washers to be sold on the retail market for $85 each. He set up a shop in Benton Harbor where, with the help of his brother Frederick, he built the electric washers while commuting to his job at Commonwealth Edison in Chicago, approximately 100 miles away. It was said that Louis painted the washers by hand, and Frederick crated them and took them by horse-drawn cart to the shipping point.

Louis and Frederick Upton delivered the 100 washing machines. However, a major problem arose: with daily use, the gears of every washer broke down. Federal Electric's president, John F. Gilchrist, summoned the 25-year-old Upton to his office and demanded the money back saying, “Your product is a failure and money must be refunded to purchasers”. Upton replied that he would refund the money but did not have it at the time. He went on to explain that he had already spoken to Federal's master mechanic about a fix, and, with some time, could solve the problem. Federal agreed, and the master mechanic, Gustav B. Keil, who later came to work for Upton, solved the problem by using steel rather than cast iron in the gears. Describing the new gears, he told Upton, "They're O.K. I've used everything on them but an axe”. In the end, Federal Electric agreed with Keil and Upton emerged from disgrace with an order of 200 washers – but with new gears.

=== Upton Machine Company ===
Louis Upton got the 200 washers turned out as he promised, but the costs proved to be excessive. This time he was really broke, but production was on the way up – producing 10 machines a day. He looked around for a financial backer, and he found one in a LaGrange friend and banker, Lowell C. Bassford. Bassford agreed to supply $5000 on the condition that Louis work for the company full-time, quitting his job at Commonwealth Edison. Thus was formed the Upton Machine Company on November 11, 1911, by Louis Upton, his uncle Emory Upton and Lowell Bassford. Louis took on the role as president, while Emory was Secretary and Treasurer. Louis’ brother Frederick joined the company a few months later in 1912 as office manager. The company soon moved to a small building in the Edgewater area of St. Joseph, Michigan. In the beginning, Louis paid himself a salary of $10 a week while Fred received $8. Emory Upton was the high salaried man at $30 a week. Bassford had received 500 shares of stock in return for his capital, while Emory received 1,265 shares and Louis 1,000 shares in the new company.

==== Meager consumer demand ====
While it is true that the early 1900s was a time of numerous electricity-driven home inventions, Upton's customers, the women who washed the clothes, did not immediately embrace the electric washer. One reason may have been the experience involved in using the machine, which a newspaper described this way; "The hand washers of those days enabled a woman to rock back and forth in a chair as she pulled the handle which operated the rocking action of the washer. The electrified version of this washer was a fearful and wonderful object. It was a hand washer with a motor added, and power transmitted to the washing mechanism by means of a belt drive and cast iron gears. All the mechanism was exposed; all of it could get wet, and often did. The possibility of electrocution went practically hand-in-hand with the down payment. But it was electric. And it did work." Weak initial demand for the electric washer may also have been due to a simple reluctance to change. The local newspaper summarized: “The company did not flourish as well as was expected, for there was but a meager demand for those hazardous contraptions, electric washing machines, and many women of the era felt that if wash tubs were good enough for grandma, they were good enough for them.”

On October 1, 1912, to run the company leaner, the board decided to lower executive salaries. Emory Upton's pay was lowered to $0.50/hour for all time put into the business. Louis was to receive salary not to exceed $15 per week as president. None of the workers' pay was affected.

Another blow struck in early 1913 when the Federal Electric Company, foreseeing wider acceptance for electric washers, decided to begin manufacturing the machines itself. The Upton Machine Company had lost its best customer at the exact moment when its washer production was beginning to increase.

==== Boy scout kits and air rifles ====
Facing the problem of insufficient demand, Louis Upton improvised. The American Tool Works, located across the street from the Upton Machine Company, had run into financial difficulties after a fire destroyed their factory on October 29, 1909. In 1914, Upton Machine Co. took over the plant, which made the Sterling air rifle, camp kits and lithograph toys. A deal was made with owner Frank Graves for Upton Machine Co. to take over the $25,000 mortgage and paid out another $25,000 in Upton Machine Co. stock. The deal came with fresh capital from Lowell C. Bassford who put in another $2,500 and another LaGrange man, Chas. F. Braffett who invested $10,000. The board of directors grew to five men; Braffett's investment made him president of the company. Louis Upton was vice president and general manager, E.A. Blakeslee who was the President of the St. Joseph's chamber of commerce became treasurer, Emory Upton was secretary and Louis's brother Frederick Upton joined the board and was given the title of Assistant Manager, he was also awarded 235 stock shares in lieu of back salary due him and services rendered. After restructuring, the company was employing about 40 mechanics and combining the two industries under one mutual sales team.

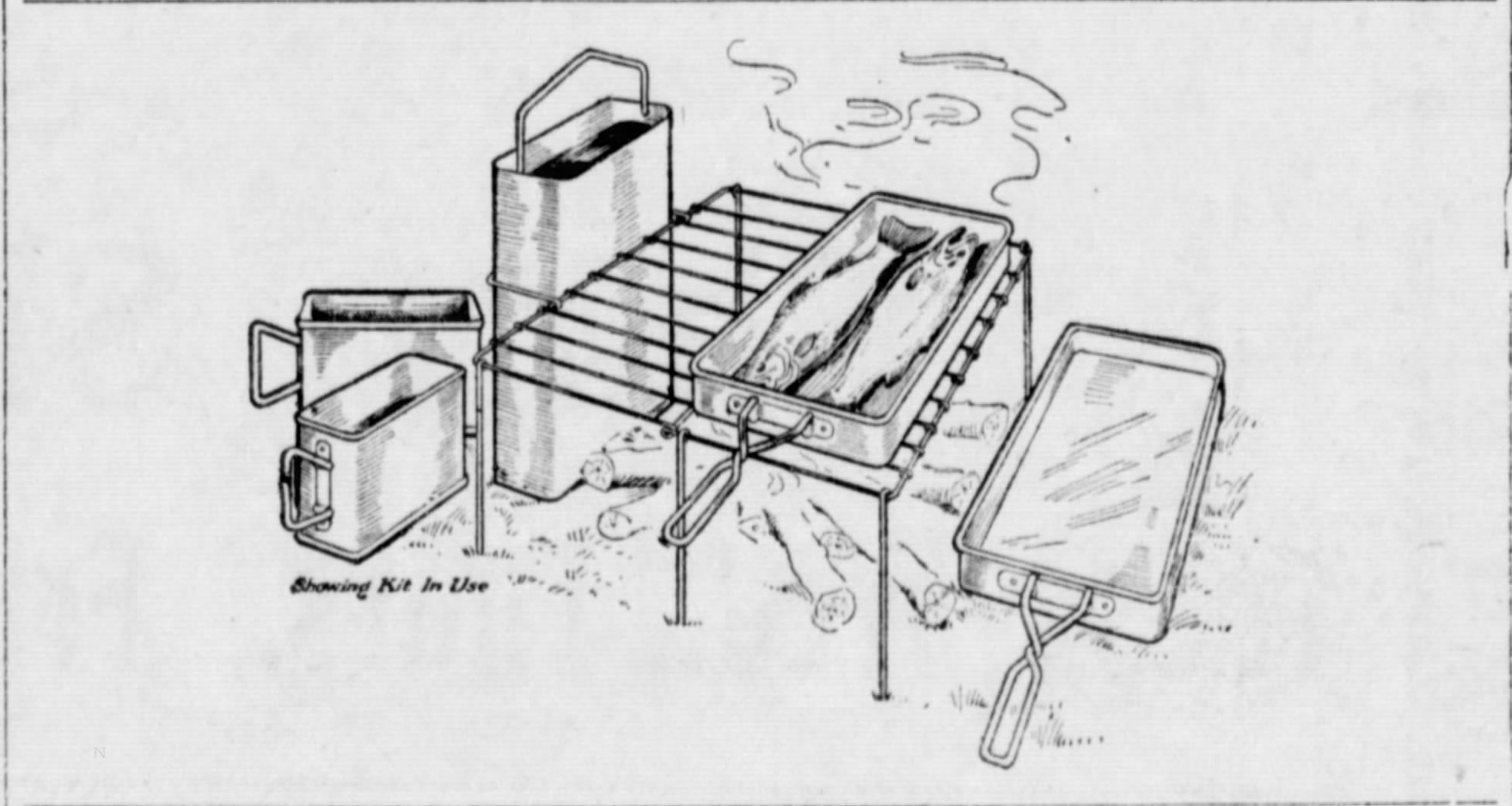
The Kamp-Kook-Kit, A portable Camp Kit that fits in your pocket.

During 1914, the Upton Machine Co. worked to improve the air rifle and since the Sterling name had a poor reputation, renamed the product The Upton. Temporarily, washers became a sidelight while air rifles kept the company afloat. In 1915, washing machine sales were only $18,000, while the rifle business totalled $62,000 in sales.

Things finally turned around for the washing machine business when in April 1916, Louis got a meeting at the Sears, Roebuck and Company, which at that point had sold only hand washers, mistrusting the electric contrivances. But at his first sales meeting with Sears, armed with an electric washer, Louis Upton came away with an order for 25 machines monthly, but sales were by catalog only. The business relationship with Sears planted a seed for its growth to the top of laundry manufacturers in the United States.

On October 19, 1917, Chas. F. Braffett, president of Upton Machine Co. was found dead on his kitchen floor by a member of his family. An opened gas line in the kitchen was put forth as conclusive evidence that the cause of his death was suicide. According to the St. Joseph Herald-Press, Braffett left no word of explanation, but it was known he had been despondent about his ill health.

At the following shareholder meeting, the company announced the new corporate structure. Lowell C. Bassford was to take over as president. Louis stayed on as vice president and general manager, his new brother-in-law H.T. Campbell became secretary, and Frederick Upton as superintendent.

In February 1918, the Upton Machine Co. paid the Stopple Kook Kit Company $5,000 for the patents, tools and manufacturing rights to make a pocket camping kit called the "Kamp-Kook-Kit" that eventually became the official Boy Scout mess kit.

==== Sears, Roebuck and Company ====
In June 1920, Sears ordered 15,000 washers that were to be built as soon as possible. The Upton Machine Co. building was too small to produce the order, so in 1921, Sears loaned the Upton Machine Co. $87,500 to add a building next to the original washer plant, extending in an "L" shape toward the west. But before any machines were built, the economy slumped and Sears canceled its order. The Upton Machine Co. now owed Sears $87,500 and had no way to repay it. Sears agreed to cancel the loan in exchange for shares of stock in the Upton Machine Co., a transaction that built a strong tie between the two companies. The washer plant addition was completed in 1924 and was equipped to make 100 washers a day, including at least 50 a day exclusively for Sears.

In 1925, the economy had recovered and Sears agreed that the Upton Machine Co. would be its sole provider of washing machines. Upton had an idea; up to that point, Sears sold its products through its catalogue. Upton believed that major purchases such as washing machines needed expert face to face sales involvement and he sold the idea to former Brigader general Robert E. Wood, Sears, Roebuck and Company’s president. Upton Machine Company began selling washers and ironers in Sears’ 80 retail locations. Upton Machine Company salesmen organized sales, set up displays, and trained Sears sales personnel. It was another turning point in the history of the Upton company—in three years, the Sears sales of home laundry appliances jumped from 25,000 to 1,250,000 yearly.

==== Largest toy manufacturer in the Mid-West ====
On February 20, 1928, the Upton Machine Co. announced a large contract to start mass production of light metal toys for the F.W. Woolworth and S. S. Kresge companies and several other large syndicate stores throughout the United States. To make room for the expansion in the toy manufacturing industry it sold its air rifle business to the All Metal Products Company of Detroit, Michigan. The same day Upton announced that the company planned to add from 100 to 150 men and women to their payroll.

Over the following 30 days, the company re-arranged and equipped the old air rifle plant with dies, tools, machines and other special equipment to increase production to 20,000 toys daily, making it the largest manufacturer of toys in the middle west. One of the first toys produced was an "exact toy replica of the new Ford". Other toys made in the new plant were tops, motor buses, trucks, wrecking trucks with crane, toy vans, express trucks and several other novelties.

In May 1928, the company announced record-high first-quarter profits of approximately $75,000 along with a capital stock increase from 25,000 to 75,000. Stockholders were paid 100% dividends. Bassford, by then in very poor health, sold his interests in the company and resigned as its president, he died a few months later. Louis was elected president and Frederick was elected vice president and secretary-treasurer.

=== Merger with the Nineteen Hundred Co. ===
On April 3, 1929, Louis announced that the Upton Machine Co will merge with the Nineteen Hundred Washer Company of Binghamton, New York, one of the pioneers in the business and a concern that had been making washing machines since 1900, to create one of the leading units in the electric washing machine industry in the United States. Thomas W. Beham, who had been President of the Nineteen Hundred Washer Company, assumed the same title in the newly formed Nineteen Hundred Corporation. Louis Upton became Vice President of the new combine and remained as Director and general manager of the Upton division. Frederick became treasurer and a director of the new organization and Gus Keil remained as general superintendent and also became a director of the combine. Upton said in his announcement that the assets of the merged companies would total "several million dollars." and that the idea of the merger originated with the Uptons. The outcome was a merger on an equal basis. The eastern corporation made a more expensive type of washer and that both companies are strong financially.

The Upton Machine Company, now a division of Nineteen Hundred Co. doubled their output in 1929, greatly expanding their St. Joseph, Michigan plant size to support a new product line, known as the Kenmore in 1930. The concern was now catering to some 4000 dealers throughout the nation. The Sears-Roebuck company gave the company preferential positioning in its catalog, which has a circulation of more than 11,000,000 households. Upton machines are also sold in all of the more than 300 Sears-Roebuck retail stores.

On October 29, 1929, the stock market collapsed on what became known as "Black Tuesday," launching the country into the Great Depression. By 1932, the country's national income was down 54% with more than 86,000 businesses failed, 4,835 banks closed and 12 million people were out of work. In November 1933, due to differences in business philosophies, particularly around the company's relationship with Sears, Behan announced his resignation as president. Louis Upton is elected President of the Nineteen Hundred Corporation.

Despite the country's hardships, the company remained resilient and the period of economic change turned out to be a good thing for the company, with fewer people being able to afford maids, doing the laundry at home became increasingly essential and unlike the boom years, price made a difference. Buyers turned to Sears for savings and bought Nineteen Hundred Co.’s washers. The company was manufacturing about 25 percent of the washers and ironers sold in the country. In 1936, the company began exporting with Sears International to new important markets opening up for the Kenmore machines, primarily England, Sweden and the Canal Zone.

In 1939, the Binghamton plant was closed. All of its operations, and personnel who were willing to move, were transferred to St. Joseph, and fifty new families came into the twin cities. After a decade of depression, by 1939, the company posted sales of $5.7 million and shipped over 160,000 units. By 1941, the company was seeing record sales of 262,000 washers and ironers yielding over $10 million in sales. Government figures for 1941 confirmed the Nineteen Hundred Corporation was the largest producer of washing machines in the United States, and therefore the world.

==== The war years ====
The outbreak of World War II stopped production of civilian products, washing machines included. In May 1942, the last washing machine came off the assembly line. From then until the war ended, production was strictly military. The first war contract was for machining and assembling gun mounts. Next, a sub-contract was accepted from the Bendix Aviation corporation for making propeller controls. This was the device that permitted faster take-offs and steeper climbs by fighters and bombers. Such controls usually were custom-made, but Nineteen Hundred Co. managed to do it on a mass-production assembly line basis. The firm turned out 3,000 units a month and received the highest inspection rating the army and navy could bestow.

Louis Upton was called to Washington in 1942 as a "Dollar-A-Year Man", in the position as Chief of the Consumer's Durable Goods Division of the War Production Board, where he was co-ordinating over 19 industries into the war effort. In 1944, the Nineteen Hundred corporation received the coveted Army-Navy "E" award for its outstanding defense production in World War II. The company worked 24 hours a day, on a six-day week, and when schedules had to be met, worked all seven days per week, 24 hours per day. By November 1943, the company employed 1,595 people, of whom 620 employees were women.

Throughout the war, the Nineteen Hundred Corporation would produce 8,881 Curtiss-Wright trailing edges; 470,000 mine crates; 21,000 bomb fins; 400,025 fragmentary bombs; 91,390 linker-de-linkers; 9,912 universal machine gun legs; 20,691 Bendix Corporation arms; 503,929 carburetor parts; 198,846 gears; 91,297 chutes; 5,605 Bendix Corporation boosters; 22,927 General Electric pumps; 68,075 prop controls; 4,765 gun mounts M-2-41; 7,825 gun mounts M-800; 32,750 gun sights, and 39,571 General Electric gear cases.

=== The Whirlpool ===
Upton did not see full dedication to the war effort as an excuse to delay preparation for the future. War wouldn't last forever, and when peace returned he wanted to be in a position to offer consumers something better than they had ever seen before. He had plans to design and engineer a fully automatic spinner-type washer. Throughout the war the company made 25 major refinements and after going through 50 working models, the postwar planning had lined up so well that the first washer base to be assembled after the war was put together the day before the Japanese surrendered. On August 27, 1945, exactly one week after V-J Day, every man who wanted to return to Nineteen Hundred had been called back to work, announcing its new automatic washers, the Kenmore and Whirlpool.

On May 17, 1949, Louis Upton at the annual meeting of the concern announced his retirement from the presidency and announced the election of Elisha Gray as his successor and chief executive officer. Upton remained active with the firm, serving as chairman of the board and directing the policy of the concern.

In June 1949, the "1900 Corporation", the world's largest manufacturer of home laundry equipment, is honored by the St. Joseph Retail Merchants association by declaring Jun 6 – 13 as "1900 Week". Sears, Chamber of Commerce and others take out full-page ads thanking the company for its service to the civic and economic life of the community.

On April 20, 1950, to heighten brand awareness around its successful new offering, the company name was changed to Whirlpool Corporation. Gray noted the popularity of the company's new automatic washer marketed under Sears' Kenmore brand name and created a dual-distribution approach to manufacturing and marketing to build the Whirlpool name into a leading national brand while retaining its partnership with Sears.

On October 9, 1952, the day before his 66th birthday, Louis Upton died.

In 2011, to mark Whirlpool's 100th anniversary, the city of St. Joseph, Michigan declared June 6–10 Upton Week, marked by a series of celebratory events.

Whirlpool Corporation is still recognized today as one of the "World's Most Admired Company" being placed on Fortune Magazine's distinguished list for the ninth consecutive year in 2019.

== National business leader ==
Louis Upton was a national business leader. He held the post of Trustee for the federal government's Committee for Economic Development and was a director of the National Association of Manufacturers. He was a vice president of the United States Chamber of Commerce. He was president of the American Home Laundry Manufacturers' association, Director of the National Association of Manufacturers, and president of the Michigan Manufacturers' association. He also served as a member of the International Chamber of Commerce, and in 1947, was a delegate from the United States to the organization's international convention in Switzerland.

On June 9, 1954, Kalamazoo College, where Upton had been a member of the Board of Trustees, dedicated a new science building to the late mogul. The Louis C. Upton Science Hall, a four-floored structure reportedly cost the college $350,000.

On June 7, 1963, the $1 million technical institute at Benton Harbor Community College was renamed to Louis Cassius Upton Memorial Technical Center. The Herald-Press stated "It was an inspiring tribute from a community to a man whose character was great enough to outlive him."

== Pioneer of vacation pay ==
By all accounts, Louis Upton was a leader who cared about the quality of life of his employees. Upton pioneered the introduction of paid employee vacations to the US in 1917. The following letter to the wife of an employee who was about to take a paid vacation exemplified Upton's interest in the well-being of his employees:

″Dear Mrs. Hill,

This year we are starting a new system—which is the giving to our men, working with us a certain length of time, a vacation with pay. Bill has worked hard and with our interest always in his mind and we want to start showing that we appreciate it. From Wednesday, July 25 to Monday, July 30 is his vacation period and we want we want you to work with us to see that he gets the most good out of it. Plan some fishing trips or picnics, take the St. Joseph River boat trip, have some beach parties and so forth. Don't let Bill clean out the basement or the chicken coop or have him do odd jobs around the house. You and the family get out in the sun in the fresh air and just have a good time. We will feel amply repaid if Bill comes back with a good tan on his face as we will know then that he has had God's open air for a good tonic."

== Personal life ==
Upton married Elizabeth Fogg of Chicago on June 13, 1914. They had four children: Robert C. Upton, Phillip Upton, Judith Upton Hoyt, and Sally Upton. Robert ended up becoming Vice President of Whirlpool. Upon Louis’ death in 1952, Robert was elected to fill the void on the board of directors and was elected to the board of Children's Aid. Philip, though born deaf, distinguished himself as a champion sailboat skipper. However, in 1939, Phillip drowned in a Hudson River sailing accident while at Bard College.

Upton was a noted civic leader. Besides being one of St. Joseph's leading industrialists, he served as alderman on the St. Joseph City Council. He was the first president of the Twin Cities Community Chest. He founded and was president of the Economic Club of Southwestern Michigan, which featured speeches by national leaders in business and politics. For 12 years, he was the president of the Southwest Michigan Council and was a member of the National Boy Scout Council. He donated much of the money which permitted the Michigan Boy Scouts Council to open a Boy Scout Camp in Buchanan, Michigan. He founded or was substantially responsible for the success of the Twin City Symphonic Society, the St. Joseph Yacht Club and the St. Joseph Chamber of Commerce. Under his direction, Whirlpool created the Whirlpool Foundation which has provided more than 2,100 scholarships and honor awards worth over $17 million to children of employees. Upton, was also a trustee at several Michigan colleges. Upton received numerous awards in honor of his service to the community.

== Death ==
On October 9, 1952, the day before his 66th birthday, Louis Upton traveled by car to a business lunch near Niles, Michigan with three business friends. Five miles north of Niles, Upton looked out of the window and remarked, "It’s a beautiful day". Within minutes, he suffered a massive cerebral hemorrhage, and died in Niles Pawating Hospital few hours later.

In an editorial about Upton's life and death the next day in the St. Joseph Herald Press, the publisher, Stanley R. Banyon, wrote:

For years I have rated Lou Upton as the first citizen of St. Joseph and of the greater Twin City area. His long leadership and his contribution to civic affairs is too well known to need recital here. As the founder and head of the Whirlpool Corporation, he directed the progress and development of the country's largest washing machine plant. In so many facets of his character and his local laborers, he typified my idea of outstanding citizenship. Here was a man who put small evaluation on the material phases of life. What he loved the most was his family his friends his hometown and the opportunity to serve his fellow citizens. He walked and labored with the great, the near great and the lowly. And through it all he remained humble and unspoiled. His was always was the human, considerate touch and approach. Wherever his influence and leadership was exerted, there will be genuine mourning.

Another newspaper editorial stated:

He knew the bitterness of disappointed hopes as well as the satisfaction of accomplishment, and every setback so enriched his character that obstacles became stepping stones to success. Material success came to Mr. Upton, but it was always secondary and, it might be said, incidental. What he sought from life—and achieved—was the opportunity to be of service to his fellows and to his community. Particularly was he interested in helping youth—a desire stemming no doubt from his early struggles. He neglected no opportunity to assist young people up the ladder of citizenship and achievement. Mr. Upton counted his friends locally and over the nation by the hundreds. That is not surprising. He was selfless and unselfish in every contact. Material gains came his way because he earned them a thousand-fold. The community has lost a great citizen. He will be missed greatly, but from the foundations he helped build a better community will grow.
