= Whirlpool La Vergne plant =

- Operated: c.1987–2008
- Location: 1714 Heil Quaker Boulevard; La Vergne, Tennessee, United States
- Coordinates: 36°1′22″N 86°36′12″W
- Industry: Home appliances
- Products: air conditioners; dehumidifiers; air purifiers; built-in refrigerators
- Employees: 1,500 (2001)
- Area: 53 acres (21 ha)
- Volume: 775,000 square feet (72,000 m^{2})
- Owner: Whirlpool Corporation

Whirlpool La Vergne plant was an appliance manufacturing plant in La Vergne, Tennessee, owned by Whirlpool Corporation. The plant was closed in 2008, shifting production to Fort Smith, Arkansas.

== History ==
The plant was originally owned by Heil-Quaker, before it became a wholly-owned subsidiary of the Whirlpool Corporation. In 1986, while Whirlpool sold the majority of Heil-Quaker (including its Lewisburg, Tennessee plant) to the Canadian firm Inter-City Gas Corporation, they kept the La Vergne site as a key regional manufacturing and distribution center for room air conditioners and dehumidifiers.

By the 1990s and early 2000s, the facility employed roughly 1,500 to 2,100 workers at peak times, producing built-in refrigerators, air purifiers, and dehumidifiers. In June 2007, Whirlpool announced it was eliminating 330 jobs at its La Vergne, Tennessee, plant as it transitioned production of dehumidifiers and air purifiers to third-party manufacturers overseas.

In January 2008, Whirlpool announced that it will close the La Vergne, Tennessee, manufacturing plant, along with its 1,250-worker plant in Reynosa, Mexico. The shutdown eliminated about 500 jobs, and the company relocated its built-in refrigerator production to an existing facility in Fort Smith, Arkansas, which added about 275 positions.

The former plant was sold to Ashley Capital for $4.65 million. Since then, the property was renovated into a multi-tenant distribution facility, fully leased to companies like SVP Worldwide and mattress manufacturer Sinomax.
