= KitchenAid Greenville plant =

- Operated: 1942–present
- Location: 1701 KitchenAid Way; Greenville, Ohio, United States
- Coordinates: 40°7′53″N 84°36′37″W
- Industry: Home appliances
- Products: KitchenAid stand mixers
- Employees: 1,400
- Volume: 1,200,000 square feet (110,000 m^{2})
- Owner: Whirlpool Corporation

KitchenAid Greenville plant is a KitchenAid appliance manufacturing plant in Greenville, Ohio owned by Whirlpool Corporation. The factory produces over 3 million KitchenAid stand mixers annually.

== History ==
The plant was first opened in 1942 when KitchenAid purchased two buildings in the city to manufacture its iconic stand mixers. After pausing production during World War II, KitchenAid officially resumed its peacetime mixer manufacturing in 1946 by moving operations to its new plant in Greenville, Ohio. In 1955, the factory introduced its first five colored stand mixer models, launching in "Sunny Yellow", "Petal Pink", "Island Green", "Satin Chrome", and "Antique Copper"; previously the stand mixer was sold only in white.

In 1986, the factory, and its company (formerly owned by Hobart Corporation), was sold by Dart and Kraft to Whirlpool. In 1994, Whirlpool Corporation (parent company of KitchenAid) invested $12.5 million to construct a new 185,000-square-foot facility in Greenville, Ohio. Designed to occupy 47 acres, the world-class plant became the global hub for manufacturing countertop appliances like blenders and mixers.

In 2001, Whirlpool opened its one-and-only KitchenAid Experience Retail Center in historic downtown Greenville, which featured museum exhibits, cooking classes, and a store. In March 2014, Whirlpool announced a $40 million investment to nearly double the size of the Greenville plant, adding about 400 jobs in 2018. The project was part of a $80 million investment in 2016 along with another $40 million investment at its dishwasher plant in Findlay, Ohio.

On March 28, 2016, KitchenAid started producing the Pro Line Blender in Greenville. Whirlpool broke ground in August 2016 to nearly double the site's Factory Distribution Center (FDC) from 327,000 to roughly 650,000 square feet.
