= Whirlpool Findlay plant =

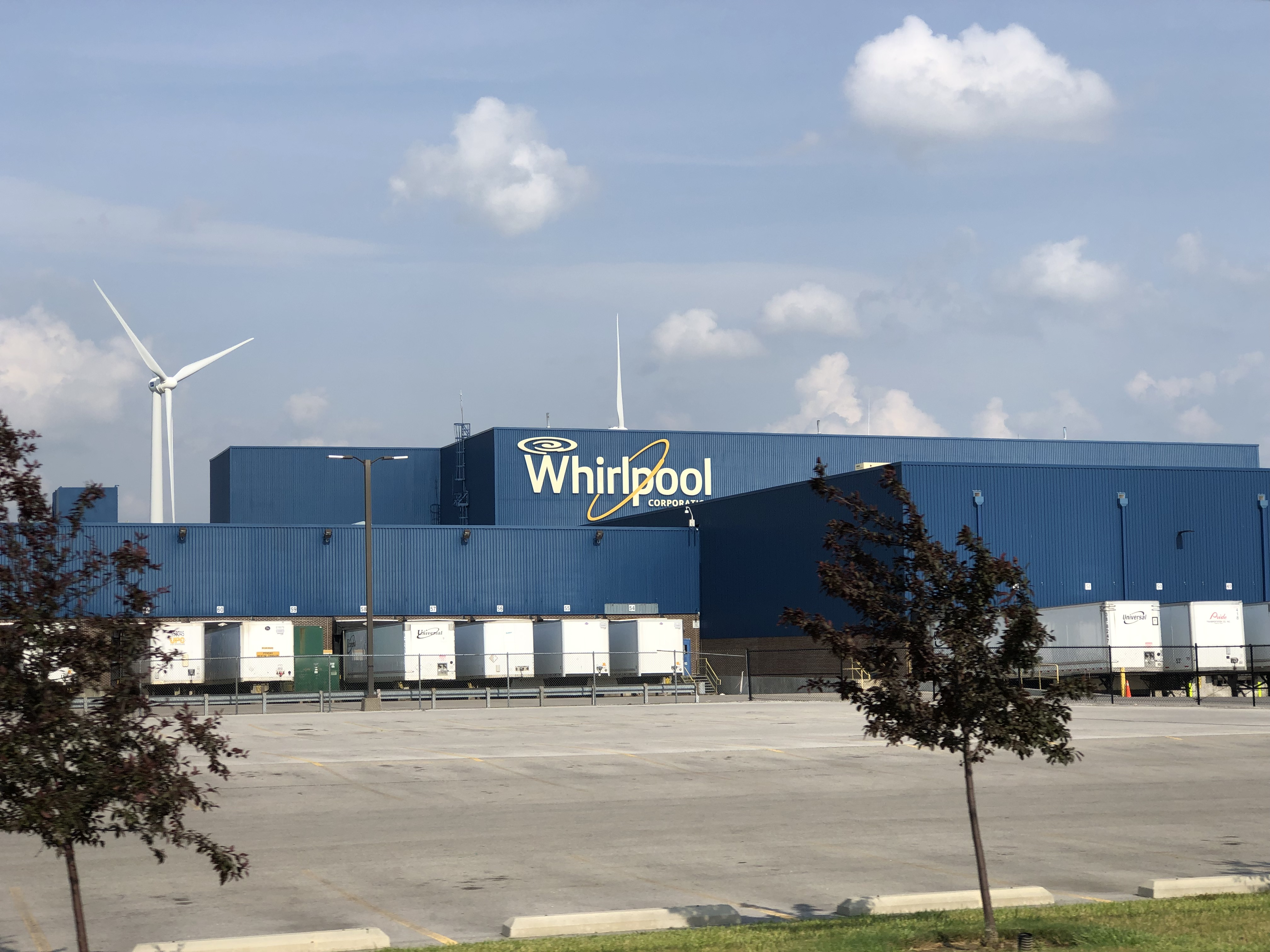
- Operated: 1967–present
- Location: 4901 North Main Street; Findlay, Ohio, United States
- Coordinates: 41°5′57″N 83°38′56″W
- Industry: Home appliances
- Products: dishwashers
- Employees: 2,200
- Volume: 1,000,000 square feet (93,000 m^{2})
- Owner: Whirlpool Corporation

Whirlpool Findlay plant is an appliance manufacturing plant in Findlay, Ohio, owned by Whirlpool Corporation. As of 2016, the Findlay facility employed roughly 2,300 people and produced up to 12,500 dishwashers daily, making it the largest dishwasher factory in the world.

== History ==
The facility was opened in 1967 as the first manufacturing plant built from the ground up by the Whirlpool Corporation in the United States. In 1981, Whirlpool moved its free-standing range production to the Findlay facility. In the early 1980s, the plant was assembling 8,000 dishwashers and free-standing electric ranges daily, however about 90% of the assembly was manual.

The success of these upgrades paved the way for Whirlpool to consolidate its dishwasher production in Findlay, closing a plant in Mt. Sterling, Kentucky, and shifting all of that manufacturing to Findlay by 1991. However, production of ranges was shifted to an facility in Oxford, Mississippi in same year as the Mt. Sterling plant closed.

In April 2003, the company temporarily lay off 315 workers at the plant because it has high inventory levels. A temporary 170-worker layoff hit Findlay later, in November 2008.

In 2016, Whirlpool invested $80 million across two Ohio facilities. This included a $40 million project at its Findlay, Ohio, dishwasher plant, and another, $40 million investment to expand the Greenville, Ohio, manufacturing plant (which produces KitchenAid stand mixers and blenders). The project added 86,400 square feet to the facility, increasing assembly capacity and creating 50 new jobs to meet strong consumer demand for Whirlpool, Maytag, and KitchenAid appliances.
