= Amana Corporation =

American brand of household appliances

- Type: Subsidiary
- Founded: 1934; 92 years ago
- Headquarters: Benton Harbor, Michigan, U.S.
- Products: Appliances
- Revenue: ▼US$19.72 billion (2022)
- Number of employees: 2,500
- Parent: Raytheon Company (1965–1997); Goodman Global (1997–2002: Corporate; 1997–present: HVAC); Maytag (2002–present); Whirlpool Corporation (2006–present)
- Website: amana.com

The Amana Corporation is an American brand of household appliances. It was founded in 1934 by George Foerstner as the Electrical Equipment Co. in Middle Amana, Iowa, to manufacture commercial walk-in coolers. The business was later owned by the Amana Society and became known as Amana Refrigeration, Inc. It is now owned by the Whirlpool Corporation. Today, the Amana brand is marketed as the economy brand of Whirlpool Corporation, slotting below Whirlpool in the lineup. Its closest competitor in the United States is the Hotpoint brand owned by GE Appliances/Haier.

== History ==
Former logo from 1945 until 2016.

The predecessors of the Amana Corporation emerged from the reform that the communistic Amana Colonies underwent in the early 1930s. George C. Foerstner, a traveling salesman for the Amana woolen mill, saw that the 1933 repeal of Prohibition would lead to a need for beverage coolers. He started the Electric Equipment Company in 1934 using $3,500 of his own savings. The company was sold to the Amana Society in 1936 and renamed the Electrical Department of the Amana Society, though Foerstner remained as manager. Goods were produced in the Middle Amana woolen mill.

In 1947, the company produced the first commercial upright freezer for the home. In 1949, it added a side-by-side refrigerator.

Around 1950, the Amana Society sold the Electrical Department to an investment group organized by Foerstner. Renamed Amana Refrigeration, Inc., the company manufactured refrigerators, and then air conditioners starting in 1954.

Amana was acquired in 1965 by Raytheon, the company that invented the microwave oven in 1947, and introduced the commercial Radarange Model 1611 in 1954. In 1967, Amana introduced a consumer model of the Radarange, the first popular microwave designed for home use.

In 1997, the company was purchased by Goodman Global (now part of Daikin North America), a heating-and-cooling manufacturer which sold it to Maytag (now part of Whirlpool) in 2002. Goodman still owns Amana's air conditioner and furnace division, and Amana home appliances are now owned and manufactured by the Whirlpool Corporation. Amana Under Counter Wine was spun off and is now marketed under the Aficionado marquee. Amana PTAC/VTAC division has been owned by Daikin since 2014.

Amana has since expanded into manufacturing a variety of other appliances, including furnaces, ovens, countertop ranges, dishwashers, and clothes washers and dryers. Whirlpool manufactures products under the Amana, JennAir, KitchenAid, Maytag and Whirlpool name at their factory in Amana, Iowa. The plant, in operation since 1940, was sold in October 2020 to Wramia001, a Chicago-based limited liability company. The company has a long-term lease agreement.

== See also ==
- Whirlpool Amana plant
