= Robertshaw =

Robertshaw is an English surname. Notable people with the surname include:

- Andrew Robertshaw (born 1956), British military historian and curator
- Chris Robertshaw (born 1948), Manx politician
- Freda Robertshaw (1916–1997), Australian artist
- Jeff Robertshaw (born 1983), Canadian football player
- Jerrold Robertshaw (1866–1941), English actor
- Kate Robertshaw (born 1990), English badminton player
- Louis Robertshaw (1912–2003), American football player and United States Marine Corps general
- Rawson Robertshaw (1861–1920), English rugby union player
