= Whirlpool Amana plant =

- Operated: 1934–present
- Location: 2800 220th Trail; Middle Amana, Iowa, United States
- Coordinates: 41°47′31″N 91°53′50″W
- Industry: Home appliances
- Products: french door refrigerators
- Employees: 2,000
- Area: 43 acres (17 ha)
- Volume: 2,200,000 square feet (200,000 m^{2})
- Owner: Whirlpool Corporation

Whirlpool Amana plant is an appliance manufacturing plant in Amana, Iowa owned by Whirlpool Corporation.

== History ==
In 2001, Maytag acquired Amana Corporation from Goodman, which includes the main plant in Amana, Iowa. In 2006, Whirlpool, which purchased Maytag this year, invested up to $11 million to expand the Amana, Iowa plant, creating up to 400 new jobs over two years to meet surging consumer demand for bottom-freezer refrigerators.

On October 27, 2011, Whirlpool Corporation announced that it would close its Fort Smith, Arkansas refrigerator manufacturing plant. The closure resulted in the loss of over 1,000 jobs and completely ceased operations on June 29, 2012, shifting production to Amana, Iowa.

In July 2025, the plant began reducing the second shift and laying off employees, with 250 job cuts this summer. This is because Whirlpool is making way for a "multi-year modernization plan" and to consolidate production lines. The company laid off approximately 400 union workers at the plant on March 9, 2026.

In June 2026, Whirlpool announced that the plant will end its second-shift production by July 5th of the year, eliminating another 288 roles, and temporary suspending top-freezer refrigerator production. Local 1526 of the International Association of Machinists (IAM) strongly condemned these cuts while Whirlpool continued expanding operations in Mexico.
