= Whirlpool Cleveland plant =

- Operated: 1916–present
- Location: 2525 Benton Pike (Northeast); Cleveland, Tennessee, United States
- Coordinates: 35°9′41″N 84°50′2″W
- Industry: Home appliances
- Products: built-in ovens; freestanding double ovens; cooktops
- Employees: 1,500 (2012)
- Volume: 1,500,000 square feet (140,000 m^{2})
- Owner: Whirlpool Corporation

Whirlpool Cleveland plant is an appliance manufacturing plant in Cleveland, Tennessee, owned by Whirlpool Corporation.

== History ==
=== Old plant ===
The original manufacturing plant in Cleveland, Tennessee, first opened its doors in 1917 as the Hardwick Stove Company, which was later purchased by Maytag in 1981. One year before in 1916, another plant in Cleveland, Tennessee was originally founded as the Dixie Foundry, producing wood, coal, and eventually gas and electric ranges.

In 1958, Dixie Products bought Magic Chef, establishing a major manufacturing presence in Cleveland. Later, Magic Chef expanded its Cleveland operations significantly by adding microwave ovens, employing nearly 1,800 workers by the late 1970s.

In 1986, Magic Chef, including its Cleveland plant, was acquired by Maytag for $740 million. Later, Maytag aggressively consolidated its recently acquired subsidiaries in the 1990s in Cleveland, Tennessee, merging the former Hardwick Stove Co. and Magic Chef operations into the unified division of Maytag Cleveland Cooking Products, employing 2,800 workers in 2001.

In early 2006, the Maytag plant in Cleveland, Tennessee, was acquired by Whirlpool Corporation along with the company. In 2007, Whirlpool shifted production of freestanding cooking ranges from the Cleveland, Tennessee plant to factories in Tulsa, Oklahoma, and Mexico, eliminating 400 jobs in Cleveland.

=== New plant ===
In the late 2000s, the Whirlpool manufacturing plant in Cleveland, Tennessee, operated out of an aging, 100-year-old facility at 740 King Edward Avenue. To modernize, Whirlpool broke ground on a new $120 million, LEED-certified, 1-million-square-foot facility on Benton Pike in 2010.

On April 10, 2012, Whirlpool opened a new manufacturing plant in Cleveland, Tennessee replacing a 123-year-old facility. The $200 million project manufactures premium cooking appliances for Whirlpool's portfolio of brands and added about 130 jobs to an established workforce of 1,500. The project also includes a distribution center.

The original century-old plants (Plants 1 and 2), which had been completely vacated when the new facility opened in 2012, were demolished in 2020. In 2025, the plant in Cleveland, Tennessee, celebrated producing its 9 millionth major kitchen appliance.
