= Whirlpool Ottawa plant =

- Operated: 1990–presemt
- Location: 677 Woodland Drive; Ottawa, Ohio, United States
- Coordinates: 41°0′7″N 84°2′20″W
- Industry: Home appliances
- Products: upright freezers; under-counter icemakers; hybrid heat-pump bases
- Employees: 400
- Volume: 530,000 square feet (49,000 m^{2})
- Owner: Whirlpool Corporation

Whirlpool Ottawa plant is an appliance manufacturing plant in Ottawa, Ohio, owned by Whirlpool Corporation.

== History ==
In May 2009, W.C. Wood (based in Guelph, Ontario, Canada) filed for creditor protection and Chapter 11 bankruptcy, ceasing operations and laying off 150 workers in Ottawa, Ohio in November.

In December 2009, Whirlpool Corporation acquired the former W.C. Wood freezer plant in Ottawa, Ohio. The purchase saved and reopened the facility, preserving 130 manufacturing jobs on May 3, 2010.

In September 2015, the plant launched "Project Alaska," an initiative to redesign and manufacture more energy-efficient upright freezers.
