= Whirlpool Tulsa plant =

- Built: 1994–1996
- Operated: 1996–present
- Location: 7301 Whirlpool Drive; Tulsa, Oklahoma, United States
- Coordinates: 36°15′41″N 95°54′59″W
- Industry: Home appliances
- Products: gas ranges; electric ranges
- Employees: 1,500 (2000)
- Volume: 887,000 square feet (82,400 m^{2})
- Owner: Whirlpool Corporation

Whirlpool Tulsa plant is an appliance manufacturing plant in Tulsa, Oklahoma, owned by Whirlpool Corporation.

== History ==
In April 1994, Whirlpool announced that it would build a $100 million, Tulsa, Oklahoma, manufacturing plant, in the Cherokee Expressway Industrial District. The construction was bolstered by a $26-million municipal bond approved by Tulsa County voters. The plant officially began operations in 1996 to build Kenmore ovens for Sears, later building Whirlpool ovens; it was originally built to produce 1 million ranges per year.

In March 2002, Whirlpool Corporation announced it would close its Montmagny, Quebec, Inglis factory by 2004, which is the last manufacturing plant producing appliances for the company in Canada, resulting in the elimination of 500 jobs. The Tulsa plant started producing cooking appliances for the Canadian market along with the Oxford, Mississippi plant.

By 2005, the plant had already generated over $250 million in payroll, allowing Whirlpool to receive the deed to the building outright, four years ahead of schedule. In June 2007, the company announced the relocation of freestanding cooking range manufacturing from its Cleveland, Tennessee, plant to the Tulsa facility, bringing new manufacturing volume and jobs to the region.

In April 2014, the plant officially reached a major milestone by producing its 20 millionth unit. Whirlpool opened an $55 million, 800,000-square-foot Factory Distribution Center in March 2020. The $55 million facility doubled the company's regional footprint and features advanced, LEED-certified climate control and conveyor systems.

In May 2021, Whirlpool announced a $15 million investment in the facility located at the Cherokee Industrial Center. This allocation was directed toward new machinery and equipment to boost production capabilities, along with a $1 million incentive package from the state of Oklahoma to drive local job creation.
