= InSinkErator =

American producer of kitchen plumbing equipment

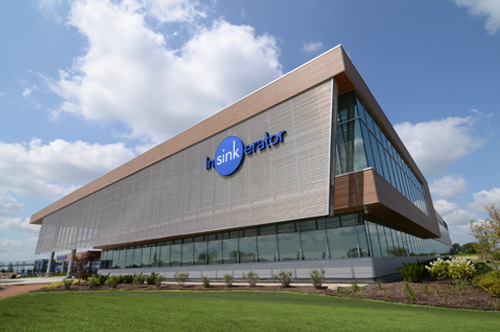
- InSinkErator Headquarters: Racine, WI
- Founded: 1938
- Founder: John W. Hammes
- Headquarters: Racine, Wisconsin, USA
- Owner: Emerson Electric (1968–2022); Whirlpool Corporation (2022–present)
- Website: www.insinkerator.com

InSinkErator is an American company and brand name known for producing instant hot water dispensers and food waste disposal systems, generally called "garbage disposals" or "garbage disposers".

== History ==
John W. Hammes, an architect, invented the first garbage disposal in 1927 in Racine, Wisconsin. After refining the design for eight years, he patented it and, in 1938, co-founded the InSinkErator Manufacturing Company with his sons. That year, the company sold 52 units. The unit utilized centrifugal force to grind and shred solid food waste into smaller particles that could be more easily flushed down the drain. The name is a play on the word "incinerator" and refers to the fact that the mouth of the disposal unit is located "in" the "sink".

The company was purchased by Emerson Electric in 1968.

On November 1, 2022, InSinkErator was acquired by Whirlpool Corporation.
