= Whirlpool Evansville plant =

- Built: 1942
- Operated: 1956–2010
- Location: 5401 North US Highway 41; Evansville, Indiana, United States
- Coordinates: 38°1′29″N 87°32′13″W
- Industry: Home appliances
- Products: top-freezer refrigerators; bottom-freezer refrigerators; icemakers
- Employees: 1,900 (2004)
- Area: 105 acres (42 ha)
- Volume: 1,700,000 square feet (160,000 m^{2})
- Owner: Whirlpool Corporation

Whirlpool Evansville plant was an appliance manufacturing plant in Evansville, Indiana owned by Whirlpool Corporation. The plant was formerly known as the "Refrigerator Capital of the World", and was closed in 2010.

== History ==
=== 1942–1970: Early history ===
The plant was originally built in 1942 as a Republic Aviation plant to produce P-47 Thunderbolt fighter planes during World War II. It was later purchased by International Harvester for refrigerator production.

In 1955, Whirlpool merged with Seeger to become Whirlpool-Seeger Corporation, acquiring Seeger's plant on Morgan Avenue in the city. Also in the same year, Whirlpool-Seeger purchased International Harvester's massive refrigeration plant on U.S. 41 North in the city and an additional local Servel property in 1958, and in 1956, the company began its Evansville operations, producing full-scale appliances within the country.

=== 1970–2003: Expansion ===
In 1970, the plant has approximately 9,900 workers at three buildings. In 1984, following a worker strike, the company closed its factory on Morgan Avenue, relocating air conditioner and compressor production to La Vergne, Tennessee and outsourcing parts.

In May 1994, the plant briefly rebuilt its workforce from 2,600 employees from the late 1980s, to approximately 5,000 employees due to a combination of concessionary union contracts and streamlining operations. However, Whirlpool announced that in 1996 it laid off over 265 workers at the plant, and shifted some of its refrigerator production to Mexico.

=== 2003–2010: Decline and closure ===
In early 2003, Whirlpool accepted a $1.3 million grant from the U.S. Department of Energy (via the Indiana Department of Commerce). This funding was to develop a new manufacturing process for energy-efficient refrigerators at the Evansville plant. When the company announced a global reorganization plan in November 2003, Whirlpool began downsizing its plant more, along with its other refrigerator factory in Fort Smith, Arkansas.

In October 2006, Whirlpool shifted bottom-freezer refrigerator production from its factory to the Maytag plant in Amana, Iowa. In the same month of that year, along with this move, dropping consumer demand for top-freezer models resulted in the layoff of about 500 employees at the Evansville, Indiana plant.

In September 2008, Whirlpool announced another, voluntary layoff of 120 employees at the refrigerator plant. Two months later in November of the same year, Whirlpool announced an temporary layoff of 100 employees at the plant.

On August 28, 2009, Whirlpool announced that it would close its 1,100-worker, Evansville, Indiana refrigerator manufacturing plant. The plant closed on June 25, 2010, resulting in termination of approximately 600 remaining workers, following the layoff of 450 employees in March of the same year when the second production shift ended; production was shifted to Mexico for top-freezer refrigerators.

=== 2010–present: Post-closure ===
In April 2011, The Kunkel Group acquired 1.2 million square feet of the former 1.7-million-square-foot refrigerator plant on US Highway 41 from Whirlpool Corporation for $2.9 million. In February 2017, Phoenix Investors purchased the remaining portions of the plant.

On August 6, 2012, Whirlpool announced it would close its Evansville Refrigeration Product Development Center, located near the former manufacturing plant in the city, by the end of 2014, and lay off the remaining 300 employees.

== See also ==
- Whirlpool Fort Smith plant
