= Whirlpool Fall River plant =

- Operated: 1965–present
- Location: 88 Currant Road; Fall River, Massachusetts, United States
- Coordinates: 41°44′37″N 71°6′59″W
- Industry: Home appliances
- Products: commercial washers; commercial dryers
- Employees: 230
- Area: 35 acres (14 ha)
- Volume: 300,000 square feet (28,000 m^{2})
- Owner: Whirlpool Corporation

Whirlpool Fall River plant is an appliance manufacturing plant in Fall River, Massachusetts, owned by Whirlpool Corporation.

== History ==
American Dryer Corporation (ADC) was founded in 1965 by Martin Slutsky, which started in a former mill building on Kilburn Street in Fall River. In 1986, ADC moved its plant to its current location in the Fall River Industrial Park.

On May 18, 2015, Whirlpool announced that it will acquire American Dryer Corporation. The acquisition was completed on July 3rd of the year.

In May 2018, Whirlpool made a $35 million investment at its Fall River, Massachusetts facility, turning it into the company's largest dedicated commercial laundry manufacturing plant; the site was upgraded to build both commercial washers and dryers. In the early 2020s, Whirlpool expanded its footprint in the plant by signing a major lease for additional warehouse and distribution space at 81 Commerce Drive.
