= Whirlpool Fort Smith plant =

- Built: 1962
- Operated: 1962–2012
- Location: 6400 Jenny Lind Road; Fort Smith, Arkansas, United States
- Coordinates: 35°19′9″N 94°24′54″W
- Industry: Home appliances
- Products: side-by-side refrigerators; built-in refrigerators; counter-depth refrigerators; trash compactors; icemaker components
- Employees: 4,600 (2005)
- Area: 145 acres (59 ha)
- Volume: 1,200,000 square feet (110,000 m^{2})
- Owner: Whirlpool Corporation

Whirlpool Fort Smith plant was an appliance manufacturing plant in Fort Smith, Arkansas, owned by Whirlpool Corporation. The plant closed in 2012.

== History ==
=== 1962–2003: Founding ===
The facility originally established on February 1, 1962 by the Norge Appliance Company, and in August 1966, Whirlpool purchased the plant from Norge.

=== 2003–2012: Decline and closing ===
In November 2003, when the company announced a global reorganization plan, Whirlpool began restructuring its plant, along with its other refrigerator factory in Evansville, Indiana. Two years later in December 2005, Whirlpool began to shift side-by-side refrigerator production to a new $250 million plant in Ramos Arizpe, Mexico, resulting in 730 voluntary layoffs by October 2006.

In August 2005, Whirlpool announced 400 layoffs at its 4,600-employee Fort Smith, Arkansas refrigerator plant, adding to earlier cuts to bring the year's total to 1,130 jobs lost. In July 2006, Whirlpool announced 200 voluntary layoffs at the plant, immediately followed in August by another 100 jobs cut from the icemaker component lines to be moved to a Maytag facility in Reynosa, Mexico.

In late 2010, the plant is no longer producing counter-depth refrigerators, and Whirlpool laid off 850 workers at the plant because Sears' long-standing contract with Whirlpool for Kenmore refrigerators had expired; it also scaled back the production of 25-cubic-foot side-by-side refrigerators.

Also on October 26th of that year, Southern Steel & Wire, a local Fort Smith factory that produced wire shelves and baskets for Whirlpool's refrigerators, announced it would be halting operations and laying off its 117 employees on January 5th of the following year. In August 2011, Whirlpool executives initiated a "study of options" for the entire Fort Smith plant, citing recessionary demand and market competition.

On October 27, 2011, Whirlpool announced that it would close its Fort Smith, Arkansas refrigerator manufacturing plant. The plant closed on June 29, 2012, resulting in the loss of 917 jobs; production was relocated to Amana, Iowa (built-in refrigerators), Ottawa, Ohio (trash compactors), and Ramos Arizpe, Mexico (side-by-side refrigerators).

In early 2017, Whirlpool sold the old plant to Phoenix Investors.

== See also ==
- Whirlpool Evansville plant
