= Whirlpool Corporation =

American home appliance manufacturer

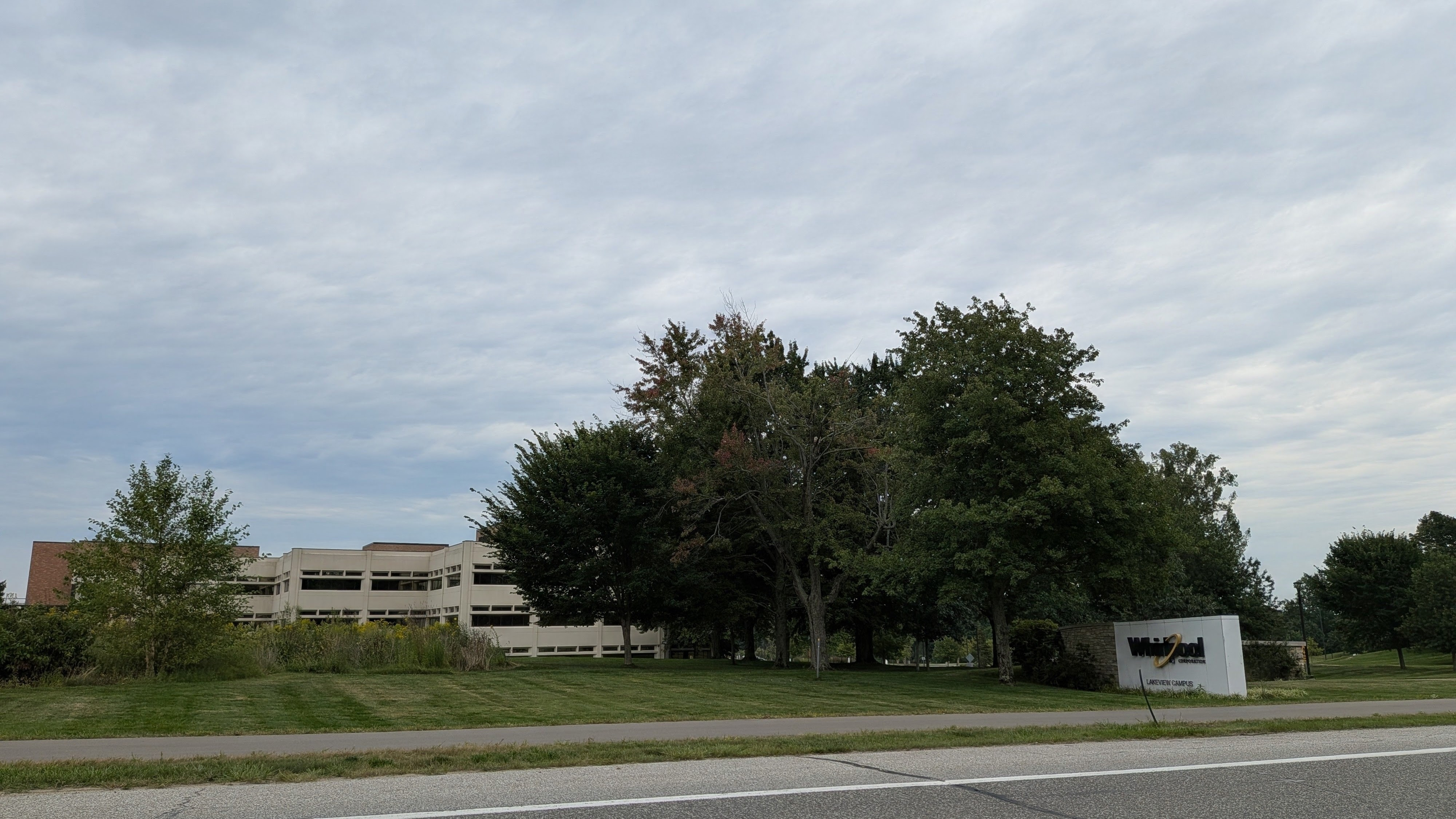
- Global headquarters in Benton Harbor, Michigan
- Type: Public
- Traded as: NYSE: WHR; S&P 400 component
- Industry: Home appliances
- Founded: November 11, 1911; 115 years ago in Benton Harbor, Michigan, U.S.
- Founders: Emory and Louis Upton
- Headquarters: Benton Harbor, Michigan, U.S.
- Area served: Worldwide
- Key people: Marc Bitzer (chairman & CEO)
- Revenue: ▼US$15.52 billion (2025)
- Operating income: ▼US$729 million (2025) (Ongoing EBIT)
- Net income: ▼US$318 million (2025)
- Total assets: ▼US$13.84 billion (2025)
- Total equity: ▲US$3.77 billion (Q1 2026)
- Number of employees: 41,000 (2025)
- Website: whirlpool.com whirlpoolcorp.com

Whirlpool Corporation is an American multinational manufacturer and marketer of home appliances headquartered in Benton Charter Township, Michigan, United States. In 2023, the Fortune 500 company had an annual revenue of approximately $19 billion in sales, around 59,000 employees, and more than 55 manufacturing and technology research centers globally.

The company's flagship brand, Whirlpool, is marketed alongside a range of other brands, including Maytag, KitchenAid, JennAir, Amana, Gladiator GarageWorks, Inglis, Estate, Brastemp, Bauknecht, InSinkErator, and Consul.

In its domestic U.S. market, Whirlpool has eleven manufacturing facilities which employ about 15,000 workers.

== History ==
=== Founding and first customers ===
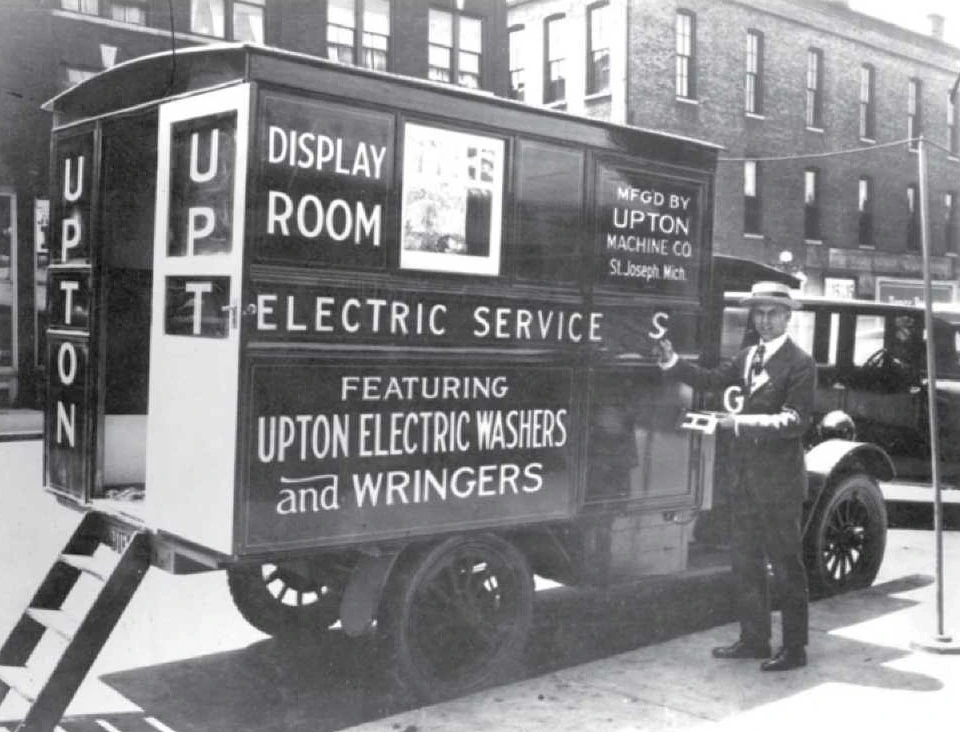
An Upton truck in the 1920s.

On November 11, 1911, Louis Upton (1886–1952), who worked as an insurance salesman, and his uncle, Emory Upton, who owned a machine shop, founded the Upton Machine Company. Following a failed business venture, Lou acquired a patent to a manual clothes washer. He approached Emory to determine if he could add an electric motor to the design. With the aid of a $5,000 investment from retailing executive Lowell Bassford, they began producing electric motor-driven wringer washers. Soon after its founding, Lou's younger brother Fred joined the company.

Their first customer, the Federal Electric division of Commonwealth Edison, ordered 100 machines, but a fault in the gear transmission led the customer to threaten their return. After the machines were recalled and repaired, Federal Electric doubled the order. They remained a customer for three years, then they began producing their own washers. The loss of Federal Electric forced Upton to diversify until, in 1916, they landed Sears, Roebuck & Co. as a customer. Sears began selling two types of Upton wringer washers under the "Allen" brand, one for $54.75 and a deluxe model for $95. Sales grew quickly, and in 1921 Sears appointed Upton as their sole supplier of washers. To avoid becoming over-reliant on Sears, Upton began marketing a washer under their own brand name.

The increasing volume of sales led Upton to merge with the Nineteen Hundred Washer Company of Binghamton, New York in 1929, adopting the name Nineteen Hundred Corporation. The company was relatively unaffected by the Great Depression. During WWII, its factories were converted to armament production. In 1947, it introduced an automatic, spinner-type washer sold by Sears under the "Kenmore" brand. A year later it was sold by the company under the "Whirlpool" brand name. Lou retired as president in 1949 and was replaced by Elisha "Bud" Gray II.

In response to the post-war consumer demand for convenience products, the company launched a range of home laundry products including wringer and automatic washers, dryers, and irons. In 1949, The Nineteen Hundred Corporation was renamed as the Whirlpool Corporation. In 1951, the philanthropic Whirlpool Foundation was established.

=== 1950s to 1980s: Early acquisitions ===
Logo used from 1949 to 1961.

To better compete with more diversified manufacturers, in 1955 Whirlpool acquired Seeger Refrigerator Company and RCA's air conditioner and cooking range lines. The company changed its name to Whirlpool-Seeger Corporation and began using the RCA-Whirlpool brand name. Whirlpool acquired International Harvester Company's refrigeration plant in Evansville, Indiana, in 1955. In 1956, a 100-acre (0.40 km^{2}) administrative center was opened in Benton Harbor, Michigan. In 1957, the RCA Whirlpool Miracle Kitchen was introduced with an estimated 15 million television viewers. The company changed its name back to Whirlpool Corporation and brought in Robert Elton Brooker as president. At the 1959 American National Exhibition at Sokolniki Park, Moscow, Brooker presided over the Whirlpool kitchen. The Whirlpool kitchen inspired the Kitchen Debate between then Vice President Richard Nixon and Soviet Premier Nikita Khrushchev.

Logo used from 1967 to 2010.

In 1966, Whirlpool dropped the RCA name, with the brand then being known as Whirlpool. The following year, the company introduced a 24-hour helpline. Also in 1966, Whirlpool purchased Warwick Electronics, a major television producer for Sears. The purchase also included the division Thomas Organ Company. Whirlpool exited the television market in 1976 by selling the operations to Japan's Sanyo Electronic Co., but retained the organ business for the electronic technology. By 1978, annual revenues exceeded $2 billion.

In 1986, Whirlpool acquired KitchenAid, a division of the Hobart Corporation. It also announced that it would close most of its manufacturing facilities in the St. Joseph, Michigan area by the end of 1988.

=== 1980s to 2000s: International Expansion ===
In 1987, Whirlpool began selling compact washers in India and acquired a majority interest in Inglis of Canada. In 1988, Whirlpool bought a 53% stake in the large-appliance division of Philips N.V., creating a joint venture called Whirlpool International. The purchase made Whirlpool the world's largest manufacturer of major appliances, with annual sales of approximately $6 billion. The remaining 47% stake was purchased from Philips in 1991, completing the acquisition. In 1989, Whirlpool acquired the Roper brand and Bauknecht of Germany.

Whirlpool entered the Indian market in the late 1980s as part of its global expansion strategy. It founded a joint venture with the TVS Group and established the first Whirlpool manufacturing facility in Puducherry, where it manufactured washing machines. In 1995, Whirlpool acquired Kelvinator India Limited, marking an entry into the refrigerator market as well. That same year, the company acquired major shares in TVS joint venture, and in 1996, the Kelvinator and TVS acquisitions were merged to create Whirlpool of India Limited. This expanded the company's portfolio on the Indian subcontinent to include washing machines, refrigerators, microwave ovens, and air conditioners. Whirlpool of India Limited is headquartered in Gurgaon, and it owns three manufacturing facilities at Faridabad, Puducherry and Pune. The Pune opened most recently, in 2022.

In 1997, the company acquired a majority stake in Embraco, a Brazilian maker of compressors for refrigeration. In 2000, it acquired Brazilian appliance maker Multibrás, owner of the brands Brastemp and Consul, including its stake in Embraco. In 2001, Inglis Ltd. changed its name to Whirlpool Canada. Whirlpool continues to market Inglis appliances to this day.

=== 2000s to 2020s: Growth and closures ===
By 2004, annual revenues exceeded $13 billion. In 2005, Maytag Corporation shareholders voted to accept Whirlpool Corporation's stock purchase. After the U.S. Justice Department approved the merger in 2006, the company acquired Maytag, including the Maytag, Jenn-Air, Amana, Jade, Magic Chef, Admiral, Hoover, and Dixie-Narco brands. It sold Dixie-Narco to Crane Co., and Amana Commercial to AGA.

In 2007, Whirlpool sold Hoover to Techtronic Industries, TTI Floorcare, and Jade Appliances to Middleby Corporation. It also closed plants in Newton, Iowa, Searcy, Arkansas, and Herrin, Illinois, resulting in the loss of 4,500 jobs in the affected communities. In 2008, Whirlpool announced the closure of plants in La Vergne, Tennessee, Reynosa, Mexico, Oxford, Mississippi, and Jackson, Tennessee.

In 2009, Whirlpool acquired WC Woods from bankruptcy and closed the company's Evansville, Indiana plant.

Logo used from 2010 to 2017.

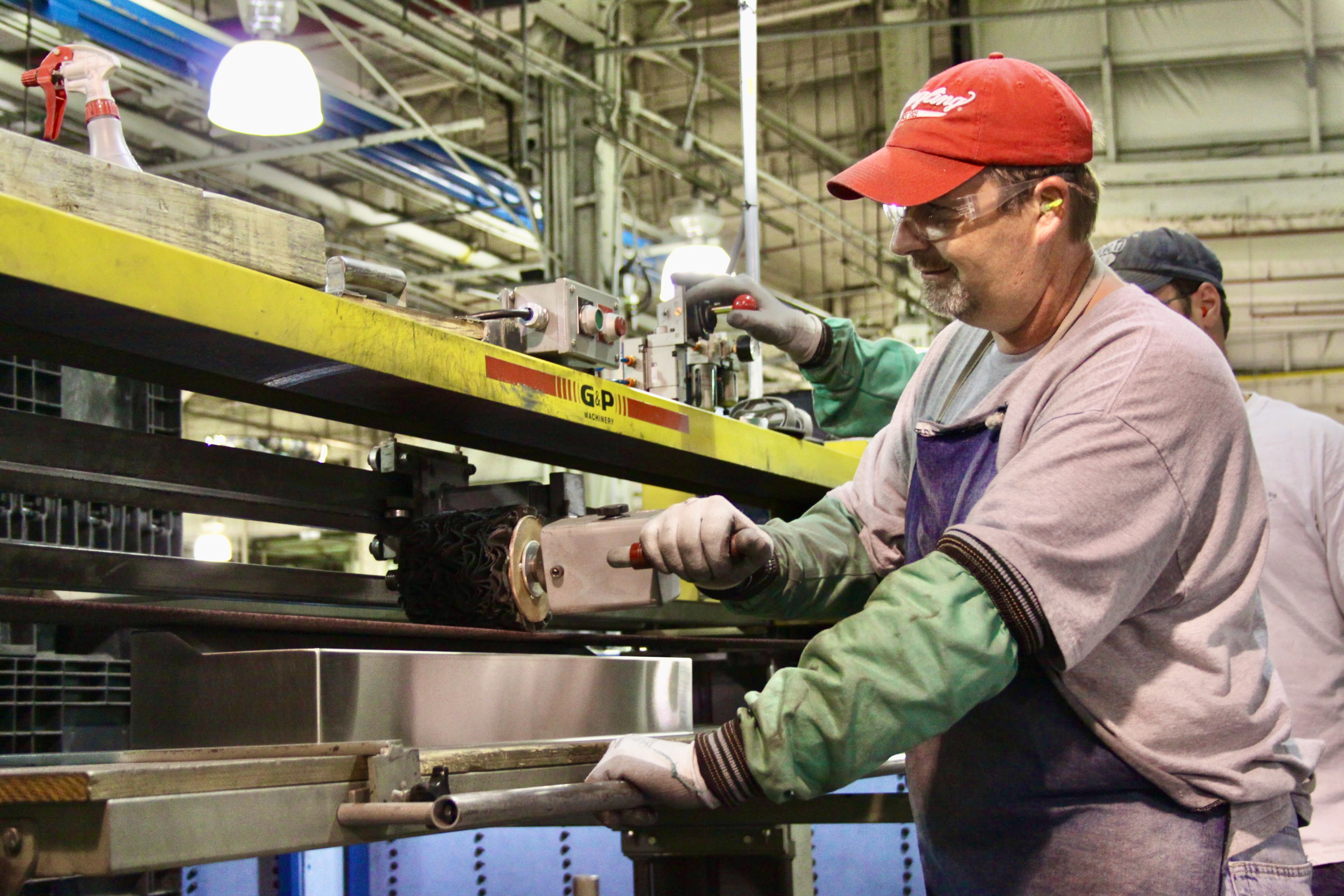
A Whirlpool employee creates appliances at the Cleveland, Tennessee, plant on Oct. 1, 2010.

In 2011, Whirlpool celebrated its 100th anniversary and unveiled its 100th anniversary logo and an updated corporate logo. It also took over the former KarstadtQuelle brand Privileg from Otto GmbH.

In 2011, Whirlpool announced the closure of the Fort Smith Arkansas plant. The following year Whirlpool opened a manufacturing plant in Cleveland, Tennessee replacing a 123-year-old facility. The $200 million project added about 130 jobs to an established workforce of 1,500. The 1-million-square-foot (93,000 m^{2}) facility manufactures premium cooking appliances for Whirlpool's portfolio of brands. The project includes a distribution center.

In August 2013, Whirlpool announced it would acquire a 51% majority stake in China's Hefei Royalstar Sanyo (a joint venture between Japan's Sanyo Electric Co, now a unit of Panasonic Corp, and Hefei State-Owned Assets Holding Company Ltd, the investment arm of the local state government) for $552 million and give the company leverage to expand in the Chinese appliance market.

In July 2014, Whirlpool announced it would pay €758 million ($1 billion) to buy a 60% stake in the Italian rival Indesit. In December Whirlpool completed a successful mandatory tender offer for the remaining shares and de-listed Indesit from the Milan Stock Exchange, becoming a wholly owned subsidiary of Whirlpool Italia Holdings S.r.l.

On May 18, 2015, Whirlpool announced that it will acquire American Dryer Corporation, a manufacturer of dryers based in Fall River, Massachusetts. The acquisition was completed on July 3rd of the year.

In January 2017, Whirlpool announced that it would cut about 500 jobs from its Europe, Middle East, and Africa dryer manufacturing units by 2018. This decision provides the closure of the plant in Amiens, France, which became an issue in the 2017 French presidential election, with both Marine Le Pen and Emmanuel Macron visiting the workers on strike before the second round.

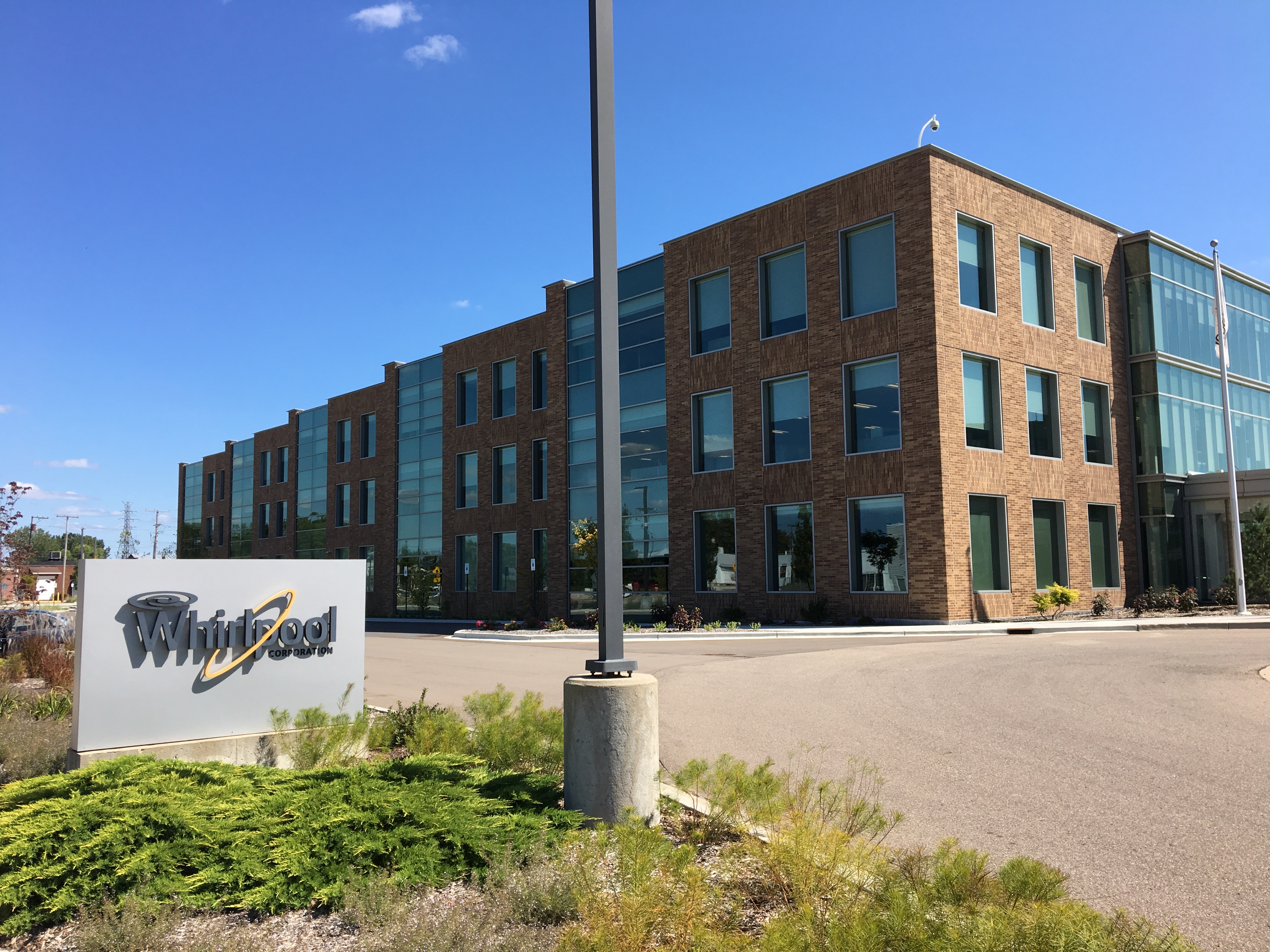
American headquarters in Benton Harbor, Michigan

In October 2017, Whirlpool and Sears Holding Corp. ended their 101-year partnership, which had allowed Whirlpool-branded appliances to be sold at Sears and Kmart stores, due to unresolved pricing negotiations. Whirlpool continues to manufacture Kenmore appliances for Sears.

In March 2020, Whirlpool Corporation announced the official opening of a new Factory Distribution Center in Tulsa, Oklahoma.

In November 2022, Whirlpool acquired the Wisconsin-based garbage disposal manufacturer InSinkErator.

=== 2020s to present: Restructuring and macroeconomic headwinds ===
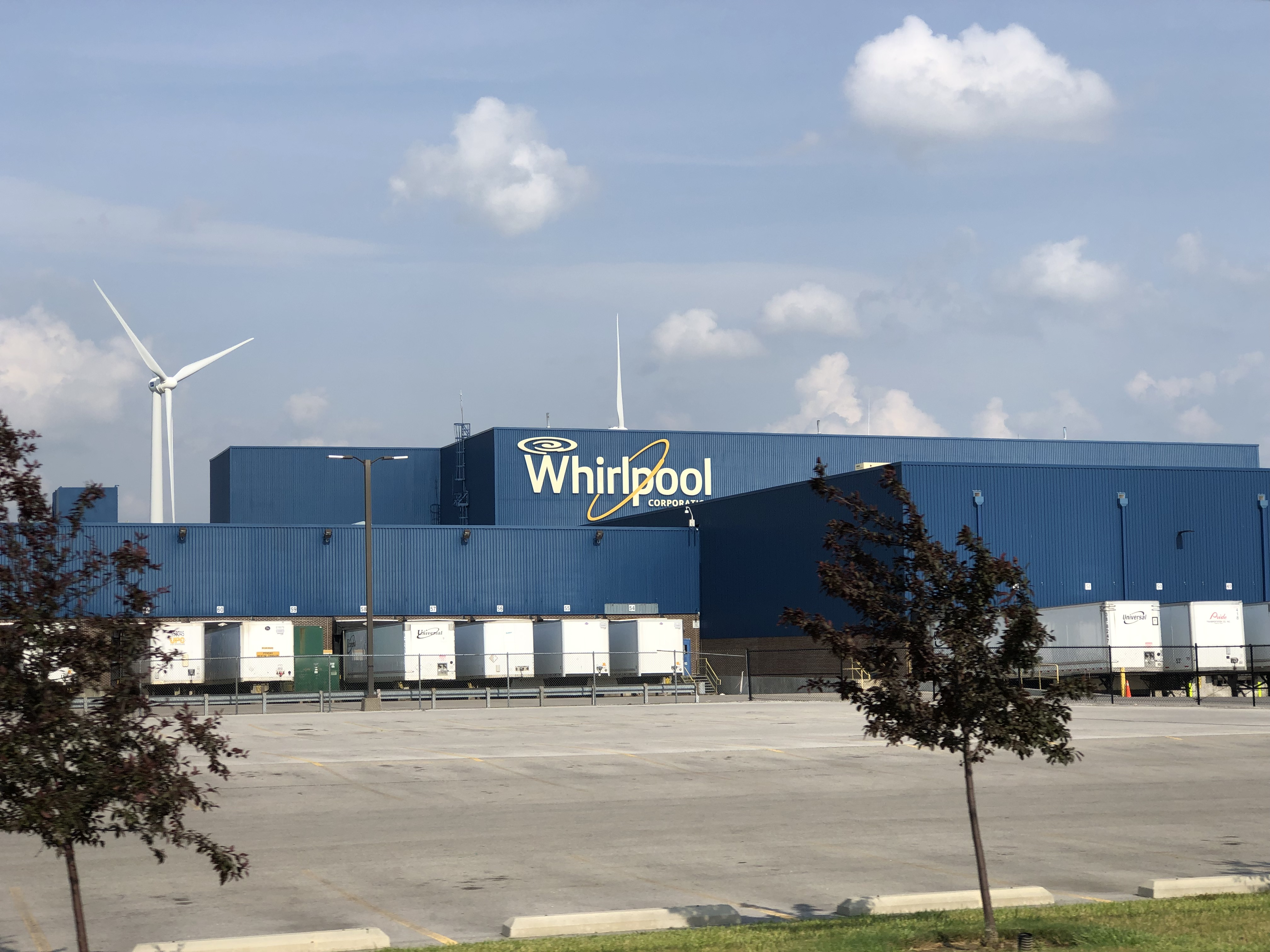
A Whirlpool plant in Findlay, Ohio.

In January 2023, Whirlpool and Arçelik A.Ş. agreed to start a new joint venture, Beko Europe B.V., which was to take over Whirlpool's appliance business in Europe, Middle East, and Africa. In August 2023, the Competition and Markets Authority started a merger inquiry, deciding in October 2023 that an in-depth investigation into this joint venture would be needed to ensure that it would not reduce competition in the UK market. This process concluded in March 2024, allowing the joint venture to go through. Arçelik owns 75% of Beko Europe while Whirlpool owns 25%, and the new joint venture now operates former Whirlpool brands such as Hotpoint and Indesit.

In February 2024, Whirlpool announced the sale of a 24% stake in its Indian subsidiary for $428 million, retaining a 51% ownership.

Supermicro will replace Whirlpool in the S&P 500 starting at market open March 18, 2024. It was possible after the sequential decline in Whirlpool's market cap, from 14.2B in the end of 2021 to less than 6B in March 2024.

In 2024, Whirlpool finalized major aspects of its portfolio transformation to reshape itself into a higher-growth, higher-margin business focused primarily on the Americas. As part of this geographic consolidation, the company successfully reduced its ownership stake in Whirlpool of India from a majority position to a minority holding of approximately 40%.

Throughout 2025, Whirlpool faced a challenging macroeconomic environment characterized by depressed U.S. housing market activity and weakened discretionary consumer demand due to home affordability issues. In response, the corporation aggressively executed a $200 million structural cost take-out program to mitigate rising supply chain costs and volatile tariff headwinds. Despite these efforts, annual net sales for fiscal 2025 fell to $15.52 billion, down from $16.60 billion in 2024. To stimulate demand, the company launched its largest pipeline of new product refreshes in over a decade, introducing more than 100 new appliances globally across its core brands, including KitchenAid, JennAir, and Maytag.

In February 2026, Whirlpool announced a strategic recapitalization plan, launching concurrent public offerings of common stock and depositary shares totaling approximately $800 million. The net proceeds were aimed at deleveraging its balance sheet by paying down outstanding balances under its revolving credit facility and accelerating strategic investments in manufacturing automation.

However, the company faced severe financial pressure in early 2026 due to rapid macroeconomic deterioration, shifting tariff landscapes, and high inventory reduction costs. In May 2026, Whirlpool reported a first-quarter GAAP net loss of $85 million, a steep reversal from the prior year's net earnings. To combat multi-year inflationary cost pressures, management announced a 10% domestic price increase in April 2026—its largest pricing action in a decade—with an additional 4% hike scheduled for July 2026. Concurrently, to prioritize over $900 million in debt reduction and preserve liquidity, the Board of Directors suspended Whirlpool's common stock dividend and slashed its full-year earnings guidance.

== Manufacturing plants ==
=== United States ===
As of 2026, Whirlpool Corporation has 11 manufacturing plants throughout the United States, which employs about 15,000 workers. Approximately 80% of its U.S. product volume were manufactured domestically.

Whirlpool manufacturing facilities in the United States
Name	Location	Products	Operated	Notes / Refs.
Clyde plant	Clyde, Ohio	top-load washing machines; front-load washing machines	1952–present	
Marion plant	Marion, Ohio	clothes dryers	1955–present	
Amana plant	Amana, Iowa	french door refrigerators	1934–present	Former Maytag plant acquired in 2006
Tulsa plant	Tulsa, Oklahoma	gas ranges; electric ranges	1996–present	
Cleveland plant	Cleveland, Tennessee	built-in ovens; freestanding double ovens; cooktops	1916–present	Original plant was acquired in 2006 from Maytag. The company has opened a new plant in 2012, replacing an older facility.
Greenville plant	Greenville, Ohio	KitchenAid stand mixers	1942–present	
Findlay plant	Findlay, Ohio	dishwashers	1967–present	First manufacturing plant in the United States to be built from the ground up by the company.
Ottawa plant	Ottawa, Ohio	upright freezers; under-counter icemakers; hybrid heat-pump bases	1990–present	
Fall River plant	Fall River, Massachusetts	commercial washers; commercial dryers	1965–present	
Racine plant	Racine, Wisconsin	InSinkErator products	1938–present	
Perrysburg plant	Perrysburg, Ohio	laundry parts	TBA	

Since its 2006 merger with Maytag, Whirlpool has closed many of its plants including Maytag's main plant in Newton, Iowa, as well as its existing plants in Evansville, Indiana and Fort Smith, Arkansas.

Former Whirlpool manufacturing facilities in the United States
Name	Location	Products	Operated	Notes / Refs.
Evansville plant	Evansville, Indiana	top-freezer refrigerators; bottom-freezer refrigerators; icemakers	1956–2010	Closed in 2010
Fort Smith plant	Fort Smith, Arkansas	side-by-side refrigerators; built-in refrigerators; counter-depth refrigerators; trash compactors; icemaker components	1962–2012	Closed in 2012
Oxford plant	Oxford, Mississippi	built-in ovens; cooktops; slide-in ranges; freestanding ranges	1963–2009	
La Vergne plant	La Vergne, Tennessee	air conditioners; dehumidifiers; air purifiers; built-in refrigerators	c.1987–2008	
Benton Harbor plant	Benton Harbor, Michigan	laundry parts	1956–2011	
Danville plant	Danville, Kentucky	vacuum cleaners	1971–2017	Acquired by Matsushita in 1990.

=== Canada ===
In March 2002, Whirlpool announced it would close its last manufacturing facility in Canada, the Inglis plant in Montmagny, Quebec, by 2004, terminating 500 workers and shifting production to facilities in Tulsa, Oklahoma and Oxford Mississippi.

=== Mexico ===
In Mexico, Whirlpool has 5 manufacturing plants; three facilities in Apodaca, Nuevo León (including Supsa, Plastics Apodaca, and Horizon) producing refrigerators and washing machines, one facility in Celaya, Guanajuato producing stoves, compact refrigerators, and semi-automatic washing machines, and one facility in Ramos Arizpe, Coahuila producing duplex and French-door refrigerators.

On July 1, 2026, Whirlpool announced it will close its Supsa refrigerator manufacturing plant in Apodaca, Mexico, by the second quarter of 2027, shifting production to its facility in Ramos Arizpe and other regional sites.

== Carbon footprint ==
Whirlpool Corporation reported Total CO2e emissions (Direct + Indirect) for the twelve months ending December 31, 2020 at 663 Kt (-21 /-3.1% y-o-y) and is committed to reaching net zero emissions by 2030.

Whirlpool Corporation's annual Total CO2e Emissions - Location-Based Scope 1 + Scope 2 (in kilotonnes)
Dec 31, 2015	Dec 31, 2016	Dec 31, 2017	Dec 31, 2018	Dec 31, 2019	Dec 31, 2020
871	833	809	754	684	663

== NASA partnership ==
In 1962, the company's research laboratories won a contract from NASA to develop the food and waste management system for Project Gemini. The company later developed freeze-dried ice cream in 1968 under contract to NASA for the Apollo missions. Returning to work with NASA under the Johnson Space Center's Advanced Exploration Systems Logistics Reduction and Repurposing project in 2021, Whirlpool developed a zero-gravity refrigerator in partnership with Purdue University and Air Squared to investigate long term food storage for deep space exploration.

== UK appliance safety recalls ==
Following its 2014 acquisition of Indesit, Whirlpool identified a fire risk affecting certain vented and condensing tumble dryers sold in the United Kingdom under the Hotpoint, Indesit, Creda, Swan and Proline brands. The affected models had been manufactured between April 2004 and September 2015; lint could accumulate and come into contact with a heating element, creating a fire risk. Whirlpool told the House of Commons Business, Energy and Industrial Strategy Committee that 5.3 million affected machines had been manufactured for the UK market.

Whirlpool began a modification programme in November 2015 rather than a full recall. Owners were initially advised that affected dryers could continue to be used under specified precautions, but the advice was changed in early 2017 to tell consumers not to use unmodified machines. In August 2016, a fire at Shepherds Court in Shepherd's Bush was attributed by the London Fire Brigade to an Indesit tumble dryer covered by Whirlpool's corrective-action programme. A House of Commons committee later criticised the decision not to initiate a full recall and the pace of the modification programme.

In April 2019, the Office for Product Safety and Standards (OPSS) concluded that the risk of harm or injury from lint fires in dryers that had been modified was low, but required Whirlpool to improve aspects of its risk management and communication with consumers. Following further intervention by OPSS, Whirlpool agreed in July 2019 to recall remaining unmodified affected tumble dryers.

In December 2019, Whirlpool also recalled an estimated 500,000 Hotpoint- and Indesit-branded washing machines because a door-lock component could overheat and create a fire risk.

== Major brands ==
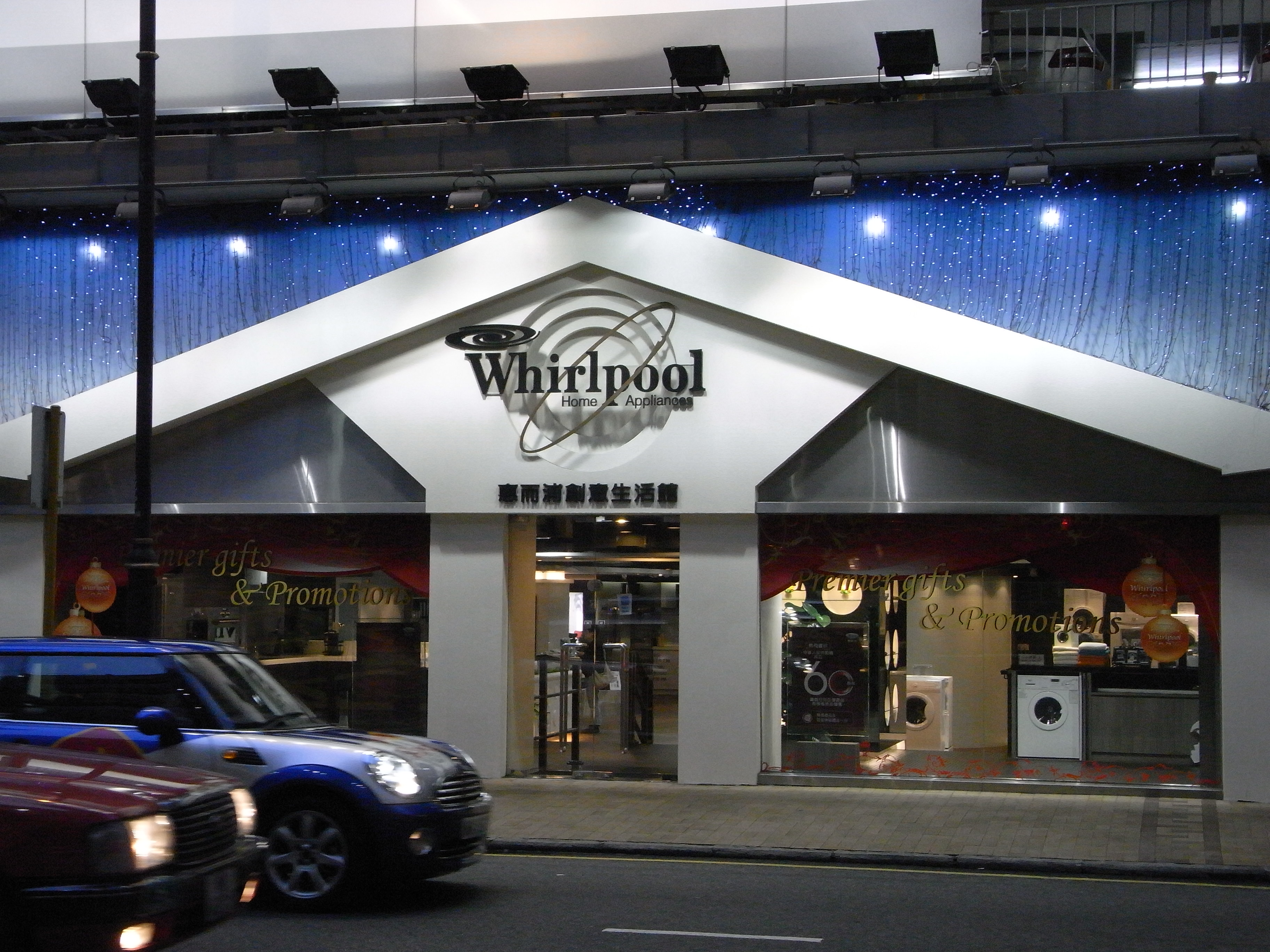
Showroom in Hong Kong

- Acros (México)
- Affresh Washer Cleaners
- Amana
- Brastemp (Brazil)
- Challenger (Colombia)
- Consul (Brazil)
- Diqua (China)
- Estate
- EveryDrop
- Gladiator GarageWorks
- Hefei Sanyo (China)
- Inglis (Canada and US)
- InSinkErator
- Jenn-Air
- KitchenAid
- Laden (France)
- Maytag
- Polar
- Roper
- Royalstar (China)
- Stinol
- True Fresh
- Whirlpool
- Yummly

=== Specialty labels ===
- Admiral-branded appliances are sold exclusively at Home Depot, the brand was also formerly sold at Montgomery Ward stores until the company's demise in 2001.
- Crosley branded top-load washing machines are made for Crosley Appliances
- Falabella branded appliances are made for Falabella (South America Only)
- FSP (Factory Specification Parts)
- IKEA branded appliances were made for IKEA
- Kenmore branded appliances were made for Sears. Although other designations were used, 110, 665, 880 and 106 are common first 3 digits in the model number of a Kenmore product built by Whirlpool.

=== Former brands ===
- Bauknecht and Privileg have been sold to "Beko Europe" of Arçelik.
