= KitchenAid =

American home appliance brand

- Product type: Kitchenware
- Current owner: Whirlpool Corporation
- Country: United States
- Introduced: 1919; 107 years ago by Hobart Corporation
- Related brands: Whirlpool Corporation (appliances); Lifetime Brands, Inc. (gadgets); Meyer Corporation (cookware & bakeware)
- Markets: International
- Previous owners: Hobart Corporation (1919–1986)
- Ambassadors: Whirlpool Corporation (appliances); Lifetime Brands, Inc. (gadgets); Meyer Corporation (cookware & bakeware)
- Tagline: For the way it's made.
- Website: www.kitchenaid.com

KitchenAid is an American home appliance brand owned by Whirlpool Corporation. The company was started in 1919 by The Hobart Manufacturing Company to produce stand mixers; the H-5 is the first model that was introduced. The company faced competition as rivals moved into this emerging market, and introduced its trademarked silhouette in the 1930s with the model "K", the work of designer Egmont Arens. The brand's stand mixers have changed little in design since, and attachments from the model "K" onwards are compatible with the modern machines.

The brand was also widely known for its dishwashers, the second product line introduced in 1949. A late 1980s promotional campaign on the back of an expansion by retailer Williams Sonoma saw brand awareness double in three years.

== History ==
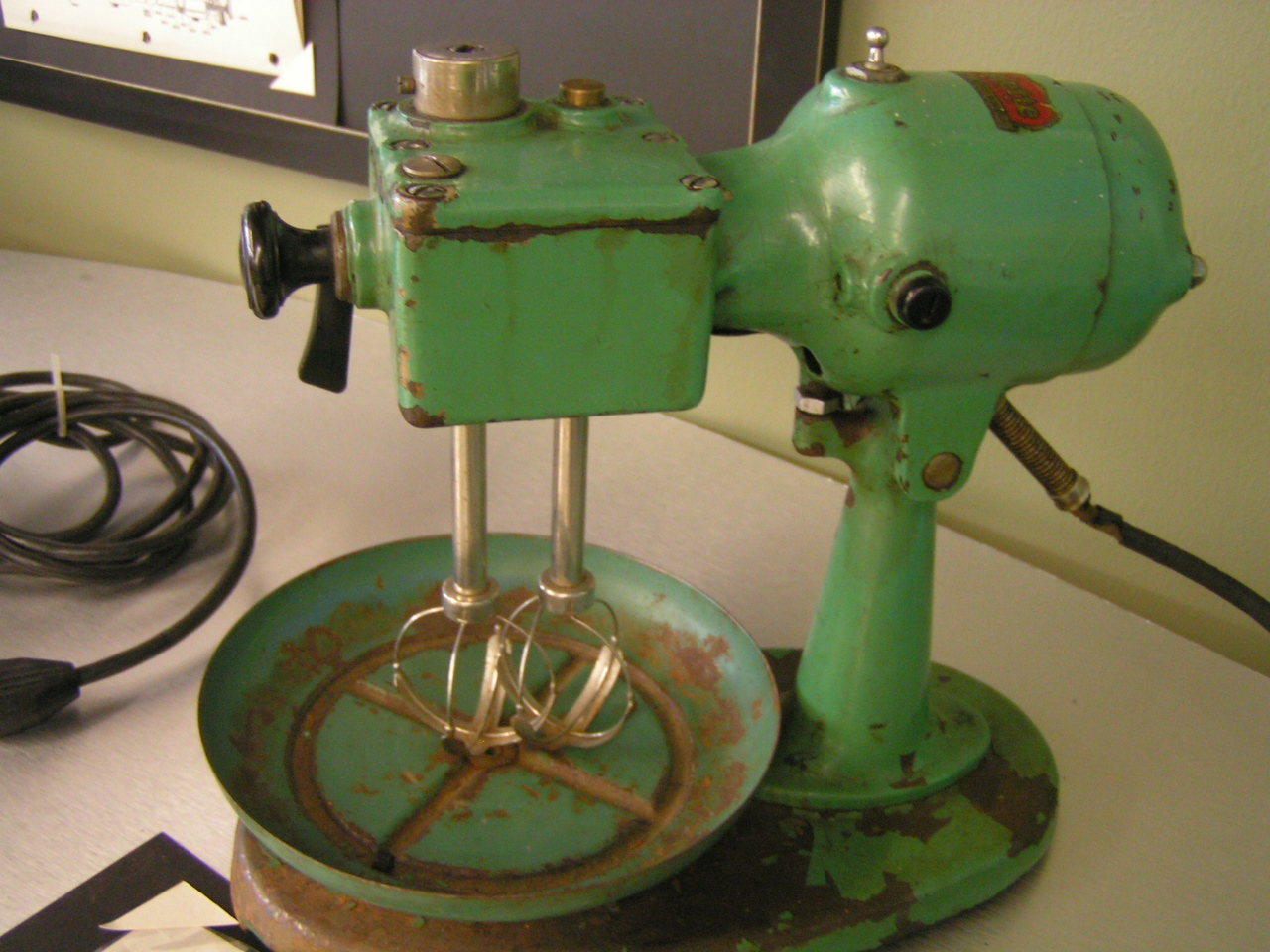
This prototype KitchenAid Model A "Kaidette" stand mixer was produced in the 1930s.

The idea of a stand mixer was formulated by Herbert Johnston, an engineer working at the Hobart Corporation. He had been inspired after seeing a baker mix dough, and thought that there must be a better way of doing the task. In 1914, development began, and soon the model "H" mixer was launched for industrial work. The U.S. Navy ordered mixers for two new Tennessee-class battleship, California and Tennessee, as well as the U.S. Navy's first dreadnought battleship, South Carolina. In 1917, Hobart stand mixers became standard equipment on all U.S. Navy ships, prompting development to begin on the first home models.

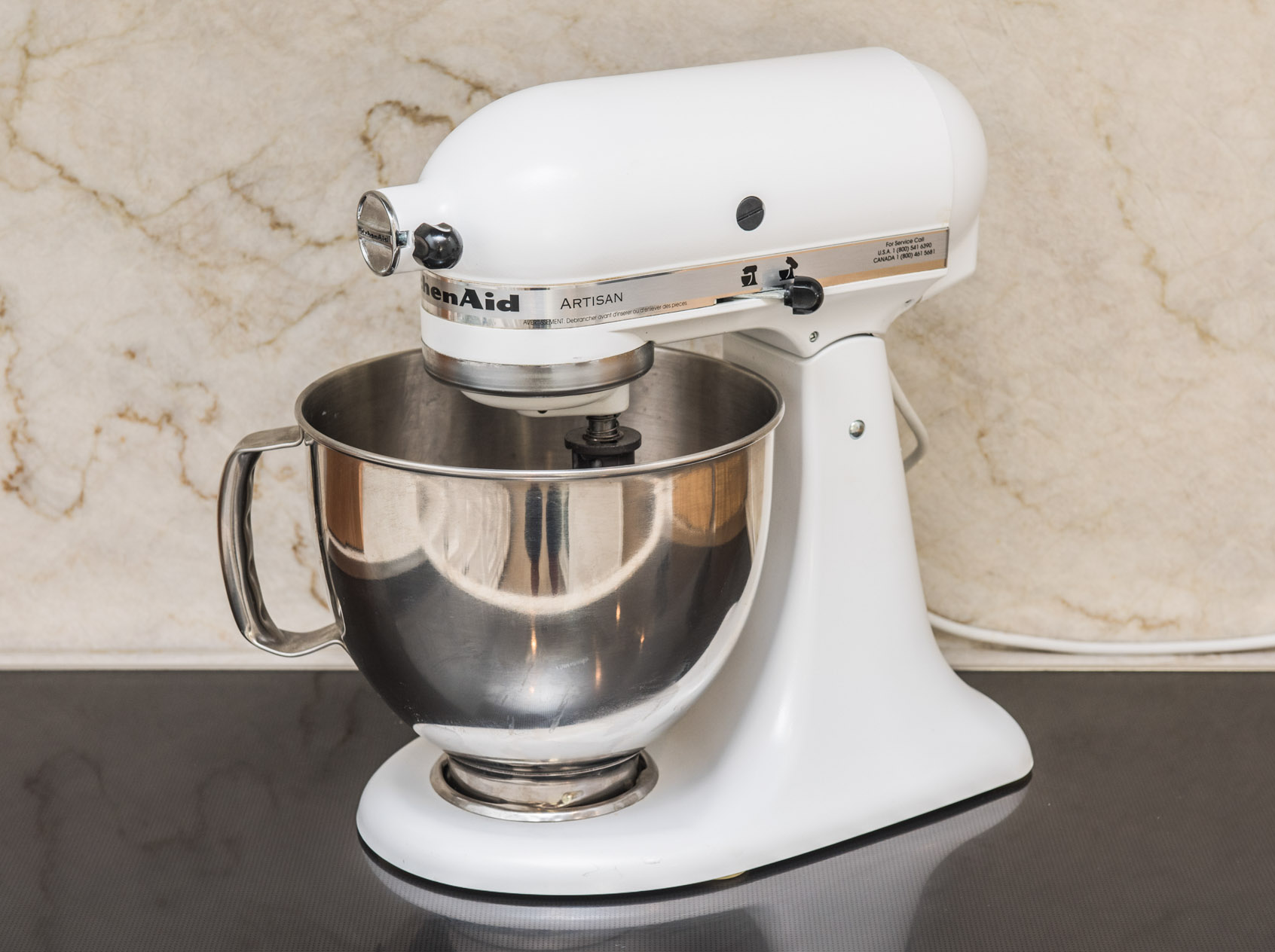
A modern KitchenAid stand mixer

The first machine with the KitchenAid name was the ten-quart C-10 model, introduced in 1918 and built at Hobart's Troy Metal Products subsidiary in Springfield, Ohio. Prototype models were given to the wives of factory executives, and the product was named when one stated, "I don't care what you call it, but I know it's the best kitchen aid I've ever had!" They were initially marketed to the farmhouse kitchen and were available in hardware stores. Owing to the difficulty in convincing retailers to take up the product, the company recruited a mostly female sales force, which sold the mixers door-to-door. The C-10 machine was also marketed heavily toward soda fountains and small commercial kitchens, and was also sold under the FountainAid and BakersAid model names.

In 1922, KitchenAid introduced the H-5 mixer as its new home-use offering. The H-5 was smaller and lighter than the C-10, and had a more manageable five-quart bowl. The model G mixer, about half the weight of the H-5, was released in August 1928. In the 1920s, several other companies introduced similar mixers, and the Sunbeam Mixmaster became the most popular among consumers until the 1950s.

KitchenAid mixers remained popular, and in the late 1930s, the factory would completely sell out its products each Christmas. The factory was closed for the duration of World War II. After the war, production started up again in 1946 when the factory moved to Greenville, Ohio, to expand capacity.

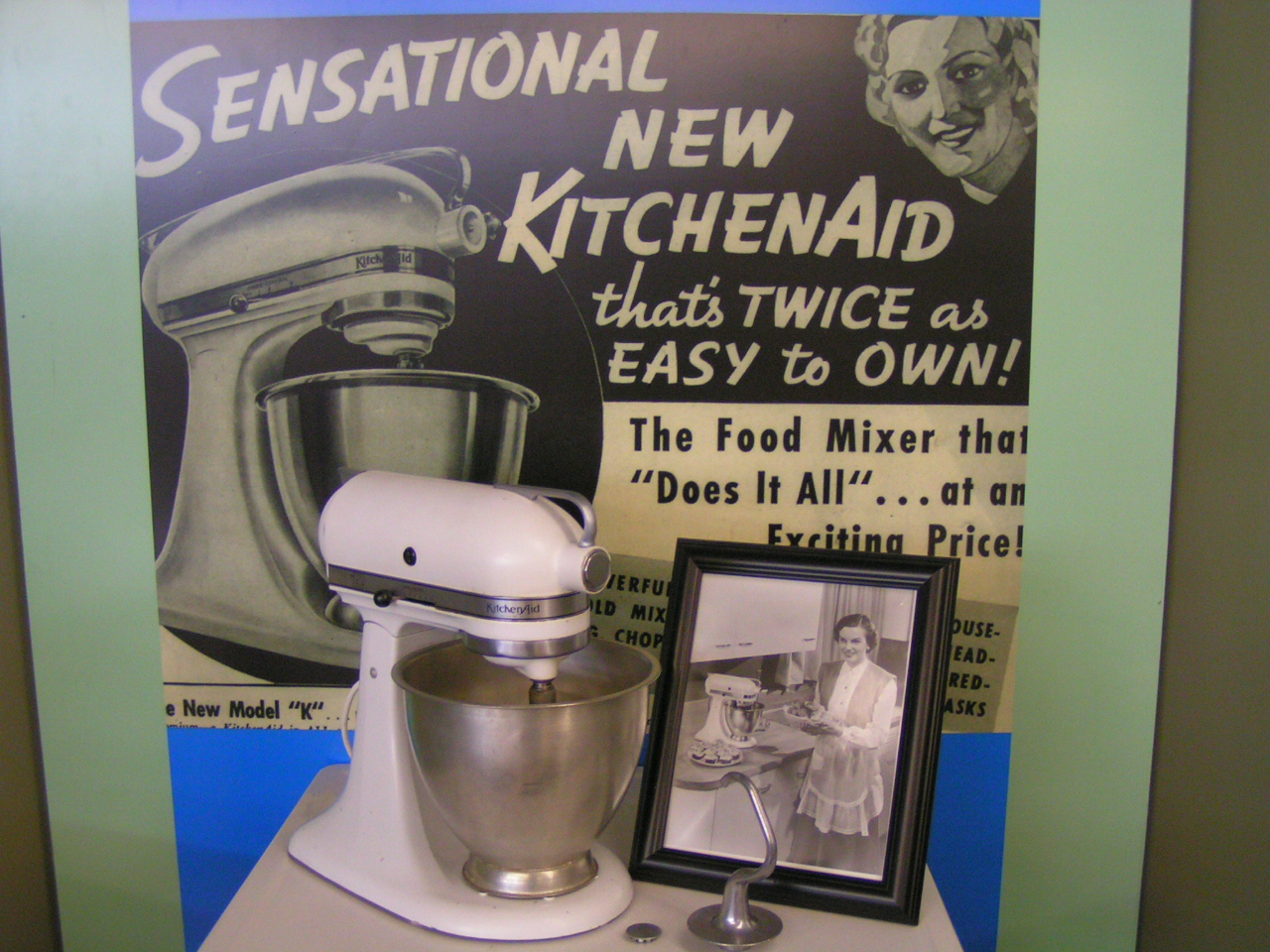
Model "K", which introduced the trademarked KitchenAid silhouette

In 1926, the Hobart Corporation acquired the Crescent Washing Machine Company, the commercial dishwasher company originally founded by Josephine Cochrane, the inventor of the dishwasher. The dishwasher market remained primarily commercial for the next 20 years, sold to hotels, cafeterias, and large restaurants. Changing attitudes and improved technology made it feasible by the end of World War II for Hobart to include a modified machine for the home market. The KitchenAid product range expanded beyond stand mixers for the first time in 1949, when its KD-10 dishwashers were first introduced.

In 1985, the company purchased the Chambers Company to incorporate its range of cookers into the KitchenAid brand. After being cleared by a federal appeals court in January 1986, Whirlpool Corporation was cleared to purchase KitchenAid for $150 million, after initial complaints regarding competition from dishwasher manufacturers White Consolidated Industries and Magic Chef were dismissed. Refrigerators were added to the product line later in 1986. The company used the popularity of celebrity chefs during the late 1980s to seize the chance to expand its customer range. In 1988, retailer Williams Sonoma was opening new stores across the United States and released a cobalt blue stand mixer for the company. Although the retailer had been carrying KitchenAid products since 1959, the new stores introduced the mixers to a wider range of home cooks. This combined with a change in marketing strategy for KitchenAid, which resulted in a doubling of brand awareness over the course of the following three years.

KitchenAid began manufacturing blenders and other small appliances in the mid-1990s. The brand was further promoted by sponsoring the PBS show Home Cooking and by introducing the mixers to television chefs such as Julia Child and Martha Stewart. Following the success with Williams Sonoma, specific points of purchase were set up in department stores such as Kohl's and Macy's. Specific color mixers were released for specific retailers or to benefit charities, such as a pink mixer released to raise funds for breast cancer research or mixers sold at Target stores being available in that company's signature shade of red. The ProLine range of appliances was launched in 2003 with an initial six-month exclusivity agreement with Williams Sonoma.

== Design and manufacturing ==
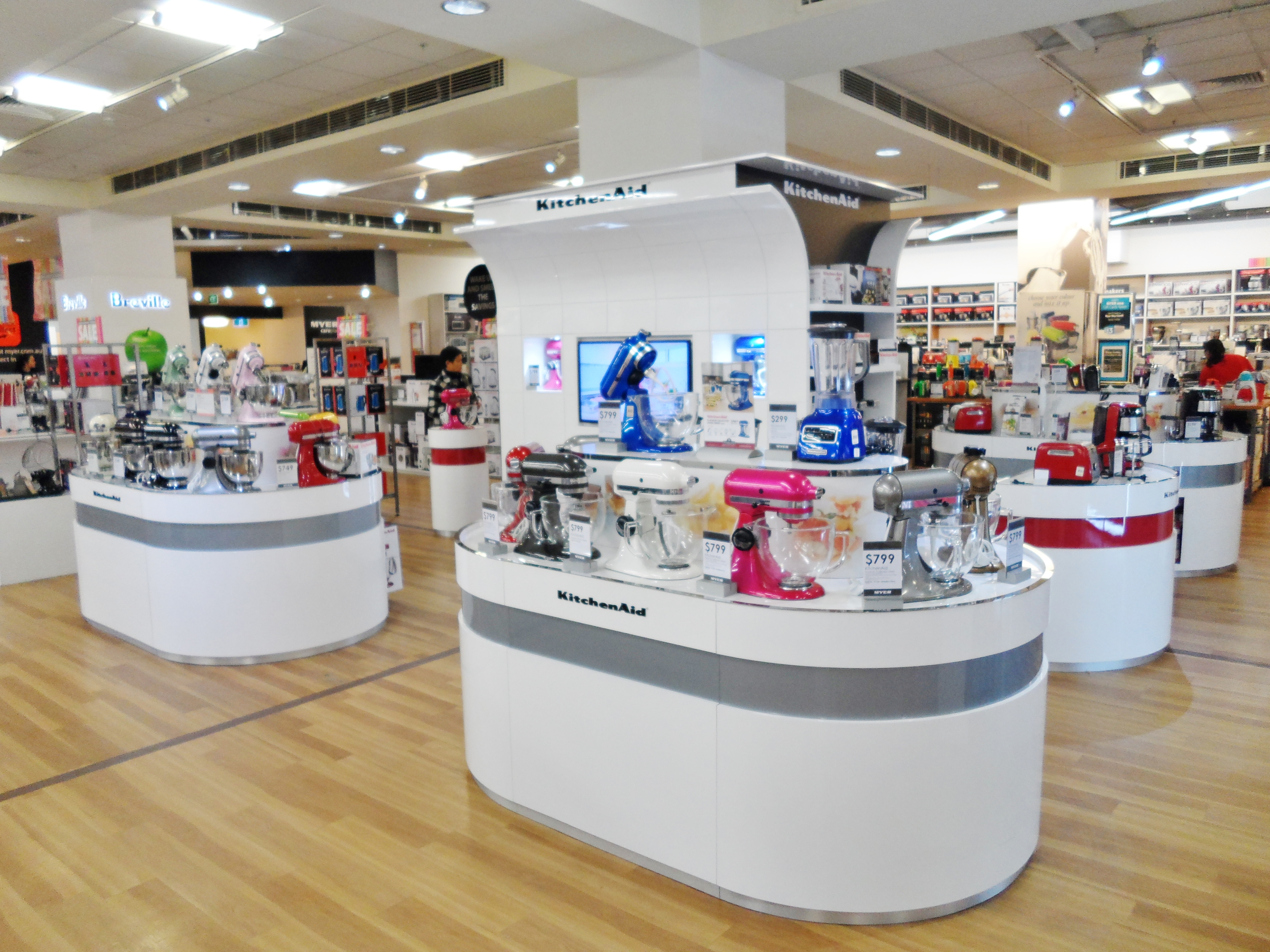
KitchenAid stand mixers have been stocked at Australian department store MYER.

Egmont Arens was hired in the 1930s to design a low-cost series of mixers. This resulted in the production of the KitchenAid Model "K" which featured a streamlined profile for the first time, and the KitchenAid standard design has remained relatively unchanged since then. The silhouette has since been made a registered trademark with the U.S. Patent and Trademark Office. In 1997, the San Francisco Museum of Modern Art selected the KitchenAid stand mixer as an icon of American design. There is an attachment hub on the front of each mixer. Every KitchenAid mixer since the introduction of the Model "K" has allowed for cross-generational attachment compatibility, meaning that attachments from the 1930s can be used on modern mixers, and vice versa. This cross-generational compatibility extends only to attachments powered through the hub. Other accessories (beaters, bowls, etc.) are not necessarily compatible even across similar models in production at the same time (for example, not all current production six-quart bowl-lift mixers use the same accessories). Initially, the mixers were only available in white; a range of four colors was introduced in 1955.

Some KitchenAid products are manufactured in Ohio, South Carolina, Iowa, Mississippi, Indiana, Arkansas, Ontario, and Quebec, while others are manufactured in China. Its appliances are distributed throughout North America. All KitchenAid stand mixers are assembled in its factory in Greenville, Ohio, though the die-cast parts come from various manufacturing plants around the world. A factory tour, known as the "KitchenAid Experience", is conducted by the assembly line workers.

== Food and retail expansion ==
In March 2016, KitchenAid announced that it would offer a line of food mixes in partnership with a Michigan food company, Franzese USA, Inc. In its press release, KitchenAid stated, “Considering that tens of millions of American kitchens are outfitted with our stand mixers, we’re confident that these mixes will become a staple in many pantries.”
