= Whirlpool Marion plant =

Whirlpool manufacturing plant in Marion, Ohio, U.S.

- Operated: 1955–present
- Location: 1300 Marion-Agosta Road; Marion, Ohio, United States
- Coordinates: 40°35′16″N 83°9′46″W
- Industry: Home appliances
- Products: clothes dryers
- Employees: 2,500
- Volume: 2,300,000 square feet (210,000 m^{2})
- Owner: Whirlpool Corporation

Whirlpool Marion plant is an appliance manufacturing plant in Marion, Ohio owned by Whirlpool Corporation. The plant was the world's largest clothes dryer factory, producing over 4 million dryers annually.

== History ==
The plant was originally operated by the Motor Products Corporation. In 1955, Whirlpool bought the manufacturing plant from the automotive parts company, and converted it into a clothes dryer production facility with 235 employees and 300 dryers per day. In 1959, the plant reached the 1-million-dryer milestone, scaling to output thousands of units daily to satisfy the booming postwar demand for appliances.

In October 1986, Whirlpool closed the historic St. Joseph, Michigan laundry manufacturing plant, which includes dryers, eliminating over 1,000 jobs and consolidating production in Marion, Ohio. In 1994, the plant began manufacturing dryers for the Canadian market following the closure of the Whirlpool plant in Cambridge, Ontario.

In November 2008, Whirlpool Corporation laid off 570 workers at its dryer manufacturing plant in Marion, Ohio. The cutbacks were directly caused by sagging consumer demand and a soft retail market for new household appliances. On October 15, 2025, Whirlpool announced a $300 million investment spread across two of its Ohio laundry manufacturing plants, creating between 400 and 600 jobs.

On April 10, 2026, Whirlpool announced a $60 million investment to build a new manufacturing plant in Perrysburg, Ohio, located at the site of the former Toledo Solar. The project, located at 1775 Progress Drive, will create approximately 150 jobs, and will produce appliance components for washers and dryers to support both Clyde and Marion plants.

== See also ==
- Whirlpool Clyde plant
