= Whirlpool Clyde plant =

Whirlpool manufacturing plant in Clyde, Ohio, U.S.

- Operated: 1952–present
- Location: 119 Birdseye Street; Clyde, Ohio, United States
- Coordinates: 41.3103°N 82.9846°W
- Industry: Home appliances
- Products: top-load washing machines; front-load washing machines
- Employees: 3,000
- Volume: 2,400,000 square feet (220,000 m^{2})
- Owner: Whirlpool Corporation

Whirlpool Clyde plant is an appliance manufacturing plant in Clyde, Ohio, owned by Whirlpool Corporation. The plant was the world's largest washing machine factory, producing over 4 million washers annually.

== History ==
The plant was originally operated by the Clyde Porcelain Steel Company. In 1952, Whirlpool bought the 250,000-square-foot manufacturing plant from a steelmaker, and converted it into a wringer washer production facility. In 1954, Whirlpool purchased an adjacent 170,000-square-foot plant from the Bendix Corporation, instantly solidifying the town as a washing machine hub.

In 1961, Whirlpool invested $12 million to its Clyde plant to have a cost-effective automated production line. In the 1970s, the facility began shifting its engineering focus to meet new energy efficiency standards, relying on reliable, belt-driven Emerson motors for its machines, phasing out serviceable Delco motors.

In the early 1980s, the facility launched the production of the Design 2000 washing machines; these washers replaced the traditional, belt-driven gearcases with a robust direct-drive motor that delivered higher spin speeds and better reliability. In October 1986, Whirlpool discontinued belt-drive washer production and closed the historic St. Joseph, Michigan laundry manufacturing plant, eliminating over 1,000 jobs and consolidating production in Clyde, Ohio.

In 1990, the plant began manufacturing washers for the Canadian market following the closure of the Whirlpool plant in Cambridge, Ontario. In 1994, Whirlpool invested $42 million in its Clyde, Ohio, plant to make its new front-load, European-style washing machines, creating 230 workers, but these machines are uncommon in the U.S. at the time.

In November 2008, Whirlpool Corporation laid off 250 workers at its washer manufacturing plant in Clyde, Ohio. The cutbacks were temporary and impacted the first shift. In April 2014, Whirlpool shifted production of its commercial front-load washing machines from Monterrey, Mexico to its Clyde plant, creating between 80 and 100 new jobs over a three-year period.

President Donald Trump visited Whirlpool Corporation in Clyde on August 6, 2020, as part of the 2020 United States presidential election campaign. Trump was the first president to visit Sandusky County in over 100 years. On October 15, 2025, Whirlpool announced a $300 million investment spread across two of its Ohio laundry manufacturing plants, creating between 400 and 600 jobs.

On April 10, 2026, Whirlpool announced a $60 million investment to build a new manufacturing plant in Perrysburg, Ohio, located at the site of the former Toledo Solar. The project, located at 1775 Progress Drive, will create approximately 150 jobs, and will produce appliance components for washers and dryers to support both Clyde and Marion plants.

== See also ==
- Whirlpool Marion plant
