= Maytag (surname) =

Maytag is a surname. Notable people with the surname include:

- Frederick Louis Maytag I, founder of Maytag Corporation
- Frederick Louis Maytag II, son of Elmer Henry Maytag
- Fritz Maytag, son of Frederick Louis Maytag II, and owner of the Anchor Brewing Company
- Elmer Henry Maytag, son of Frederick Louis Maytag I
- Lewis Bergman Maytag, son of Frederick Louis Maytag I
