= Frederick Louis Maytag =

Frederick Louis Maytag may refer to:

- Frederick Louis Maytag I (1857–1937), founded the Maytag Company
- Frederick Louis Maytag II (1911–1962), president and chairman of the Maytag company
- Fritz Maytag (Frederick Louis Maytag III, born 1937), businessman
