= Maytag Blue cheese =

Cheese produced in Iowa, U.S.

Maytag Blue Cheese
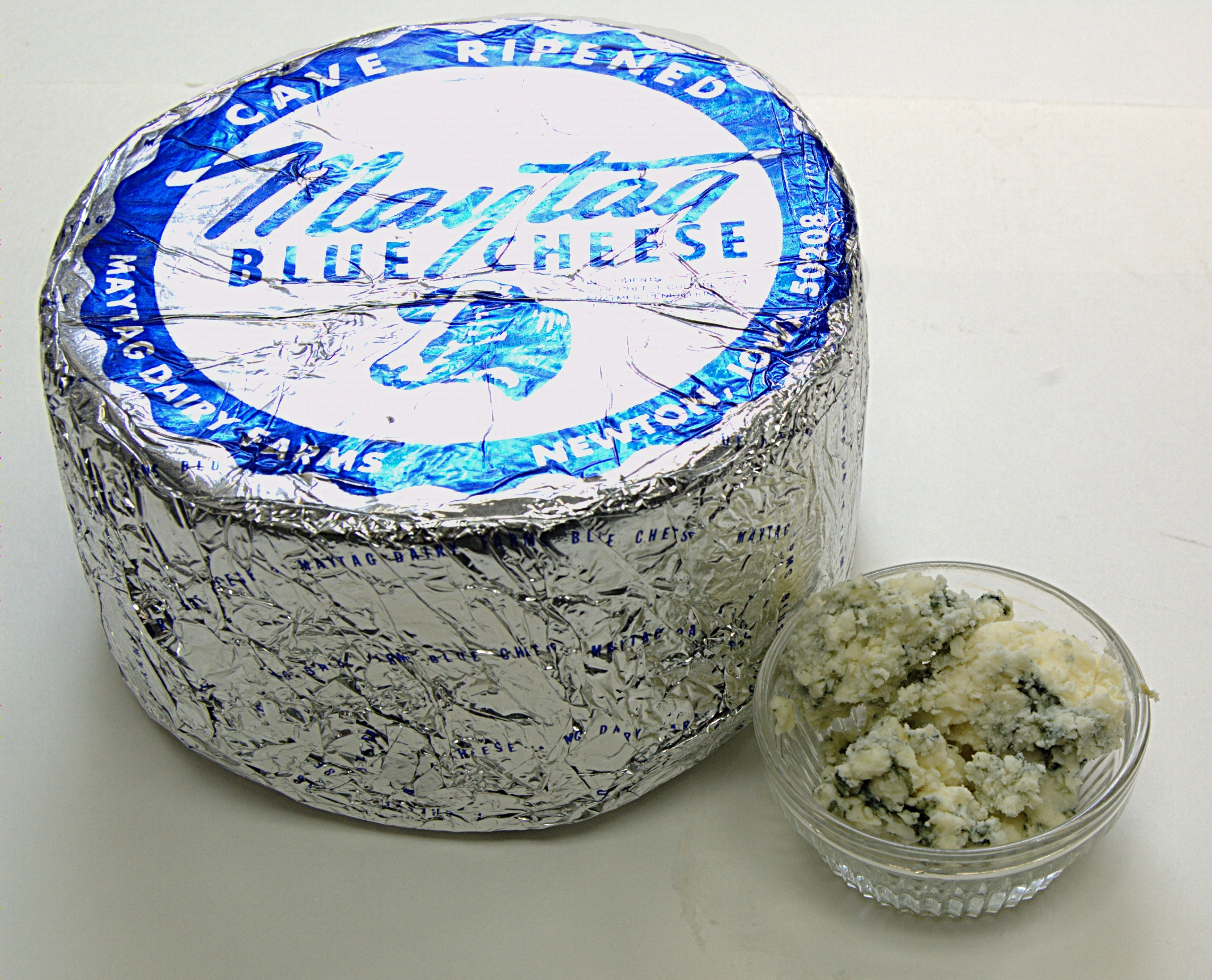
- Country of origin: United States
- Region: United States of America
- Town: Newton, Iowa
- Source of milk: Cow
- Pasteurized: Yes
- Texture: semi-hard

Maytag blue cheese is produced on the Maytag Dairy Farms just outside of Newton, Iowa city limits.

== History ==
In 1941 production of the cheese was started by Frederick Louis Maytag II and Robert Maytag, grandsons of the founder of the Maytag appliance company, Frederick Louis Maytag I. The milk for the cheese initially came from a herd of Holstein cattle that was established by Elmer Henry Maytag, a son of the Maytag founder.

The farm has survived without advertising or a sales staff.

In February 2016 Maytag issued three recalls with the FDA for possible contamination with Listeria monocytogenes, and subsequently stopped production and shipping for several months. In November 2016 operations resumed and a new fall catalog was issued.

As of September, 2017, sales had resumed.

== Process ==
The process used to make Maytag Blue Cheese was developed and patented by two Iowa State University microbiologists, Clarence Lane and Bernard W. Hammer. Roquefort, another type of blue cheese, had been made for hundreds of years in Europe, but attempts to manufacture a similar cheese in the United States had thus far been unsuccessful. Difficulties encountered in making these types of cheeses produced a less than satisfactory product, and quality control would have been disastrous.

"During the Second World War, [the] university patented the homogenisation of cheese milk and attempted to have charges levied on Danish cheese produced using homogenised milk. Their attempts failed, as it could be proved that this method had been introduced 20 years earlier in Denmark by Marius Boe."

The problems encountered with producing Roquefort type cheeses in the United States for distribution were the lengthy time required to develop the flavor, the mold growth not being uniform, the quality being below average for numerous lots produced, and the color of the curd being too dark.

The process begins with homogenizing the milk used for the cheese. The cream is separated from the milk, homogenized and then added back into the now skim milk, typically at between 80 and 100 degrees Fahrenheit (27 and 38 °C) and 2000 to 3500 pounds-force per square inch (14 to 24 MPa) of pressure. This would allow for proper fat hydrolysis, which affects the flavor of the cheese.

There is a ripening period prior to adding rennet (a mixture of enzymes that coagulates milk into curds and whey) to the cheese. Typically 3 ounces of rennet are added per 100 pounds of milk, allowing it to set in a temperature range of 85 to 86 °F (29 to 30 °C). Better results were achieved using 4 ounces of rennet per 100 pounds of milk and setting in a higher than usual temperature range of 90 to 92 °F (32 to 33 °C).

According to Lane and Hammer's records, their alterations caused the cheese-making process to speed up from this point forward, with the time spent setting, cutting and dipping nearly cut in half. Also, after dipping the cheese and allowing it to cook in hot whey, the draining time was cut from 20 to 30 minutes to 3–5 minutes.

Penicillium is then added to the finished product, which produces its characteristic green veins.

After the rounds of cheese are made by hand, the cheese is aged in specially designed caves where they are exposed to high humidity and cool temperatures.

As of 2017 the cheese continued to be made by hand with milk from local dairy farms.
