= Maytag (disambiguation) =

Maytag was an American home and commercial appliance company.

Maytag may also refer to:

- Maytag (surname)
- Maytag Dairy Farms
- A term used in whitewater kayaking to refer to a person being stuck in a hole for an extended period of time
