= Crane Williston plant =

- Built: 1966
- Operated: 1966–present
- Location: 3330 Crane Way; Williston, South Carolina, United States
- Coordinates: 33°23′37″N 81°24′3″W
- Industry: Manufacturing
- Products: vending machines
- Employees: 750
- Area: 26 acres (11 ha)
- Volume: 210,000 square feet (20,000 m^{2})
- Owner: Crane Payment Innovations

Crane Williston plant is an vending machine manufacturing plant in Williston, South Carolina, owned by Crane Payment Innovations. Originally opened in 1966 as a freezer plant, Crane acquired the former Dixie-Narco site in 2006.

== History ==
The plant was opened in May 1966 on County Road 65; operated by Revco, Inc. (which was later acquired by Admiral Corporation), producing Chill Chest freezers.

In late 1989, Maytag Corporation closed its Admiral freezer manufacturing plant in Williston, South Carolina, laying off approximately 350 employees. In 1990, after moving its headquarters and primary production lines from its manufacturing plant in Ranson, West Virginia, Dixie-Narco, a subsidiary of Maytag, reopens the site on Dixie Narco Boulevard to produce vending machines, bringing back workers after Maytag invested roughly $35 million to expand its plant.

In February 2006, Maytag announced it will sell its Dixie-Narco Williston plant following its acquisition by Whirlpool Corporation, which was completed in the end of the following month. In October 2006, Crane Company acquired Dixie-Narco Inc. (including the Williston plant) from Whirlpool Corporation for $46 million. In July 2007, EPA reached a $5.4 million consent decree with Dixie-Narco, Maytag, and Rheem to clean up contaminated soil, sediment, and groundwater at the former Admiral Home Appliances site in the same area, stemming from historical industrial wastewater discharges.
