= Maytag Herrin plant =

Maytag manufacturing plant in Herrin, Illinois, U.S.

- Built: 1946
- Operated: 1946–2006
- Location: 400 East Lyeria Drive; Herrin, Illinois, United States
- Coordinates: 37°47′50″N 89°1′17″W
- Industry: Home appliances
- Products: top-load washing machines; clothes dryers
- Employees: 1,000 (2006)
- Volume: 810,000 square feet (75,000 m^{2})
- Owner: Maytag Corporation

Maytag Herrin plant was an appliance manufacturing plant in Herrin, Illinois, owned by Maytag Corporation. The plant produces the Performa and Atlantis lines of washing machines and clothes dryers. The facility was closed in 2006 by Whirlpool Corporation, which acquired Maytag in the same year.

== History ==
The plant was built in 1946 by the Borg-Warner Corporation as a Norge plant, initially employing approximately 600 workers with the production of about 100 washing machines daily. In 1963, Norge saw major success with a new automatic washer, and employment jumped to over 1,500. Magic Chef bought Norge in 1979, and in 1986, the company was absorbed by Maytag, and the site transitioned into a major laundry manufacturing facility.

In 1996, The plant expanded its production lines as Maytag introduced new, innovative appliance series to the market. In January 2001, the Maytag plant in Herrin, Illinois announced the outsourcing of its wire harness assembly to external suppliers. The company claimed this move was necessary because it could purchase the components cheaper than it could manufacture them. Also in the same year, Maytag invested $3 million in a plant expansion designed to increase the local production of washers and dryers, adding jobs.

However in August 2003, Maytag began laying off employees at the plant. In early 2006, Maytag's Herrin, Illinois washing machine facility issued initial pink slips to about 100 workers.

On May 10, 2006, Whirlpool announced it will close the Maytag laundry manufacturing plant in Herrin, Illinois by 2007, along with their other laundry plants in Newton, Iowa and Searcy, Arkansas, as part of a plan to eliminate 4,500 jobs following their merger with Maytag. The plant closed on December 31, 2006.

== See also ==
- Maytag Newton plant
- Maytag Searcy plant
