= Gaffers and Sattler =

Mid-20th Century Appliance Company

Gaffers and Sattler, Inc.
- Type: Defunct
- Industry: Appliances
- Founded: 1925
- Fate: closed down: 1982 (approx.)
- Headquarters: Los Angeles, California, United States
- Products: gas ranges, electric ranges, built-in gas cooktops and ovens, microwave ovens, dishwashers, vent hoods, air conditioners

Gaffers and Sattler (often styled Gaffers & Sattler) was a California-based appliance company. Their gas ranges and stand-alone ovens were particularly popular in the Los Angeles area in the middle of the 20th Century.

== History ==
John H. Sattler, George A. Sattler, and W.C. Gaffers established Gaffers and Sattler, Inc. in Los Angeles in 1925. In 1946, Utility Appliance Corporation purchased both Gaffers and Sattler and Occidental Stove. Republic Corporation then purchased the company in 1961.

In 1968, Republic sold Gaffers and Sattler to Magic Chef for approximately $20 million. By the early 1970s, Businessweek referred to the business as "moneylosing." By 1978, Gaffers and Sattler accounted for approximately one quarter of Magic Chef's total sales. That same year, approximately 350 Teamsters union employees making electric and gas ranges went on strike for one month, leading to a new 35 month contract. By the late 1970s, Gaffers and Sattler employed approximately 900 individuals in a large plant in the City of Industry, California.

== Features ==
Stove features included the "Thermal Eye," which allowed the user to set the burner to a particular temperature. The "Tel-Temp Griddle" was an aluminum griddle that had a built-in thermometer. The "Roast-o-Matic" enabled the cook to delay the oven start a particular number of hours.

In 1956, gas ranges included the "oven sentinel," a probe which could be inserted into meat and then would automatically turn off the oven when the desired temperature was reached.

== Popularity ==
In 1973, Mary Tyler Moore appeared in a Gaffers and Sattler ad, highlighting the ease of use of such stoves for busy women.

== See also ==
- List of stoves
