= Kentucky common beer =

19th-century alcoholic beverage

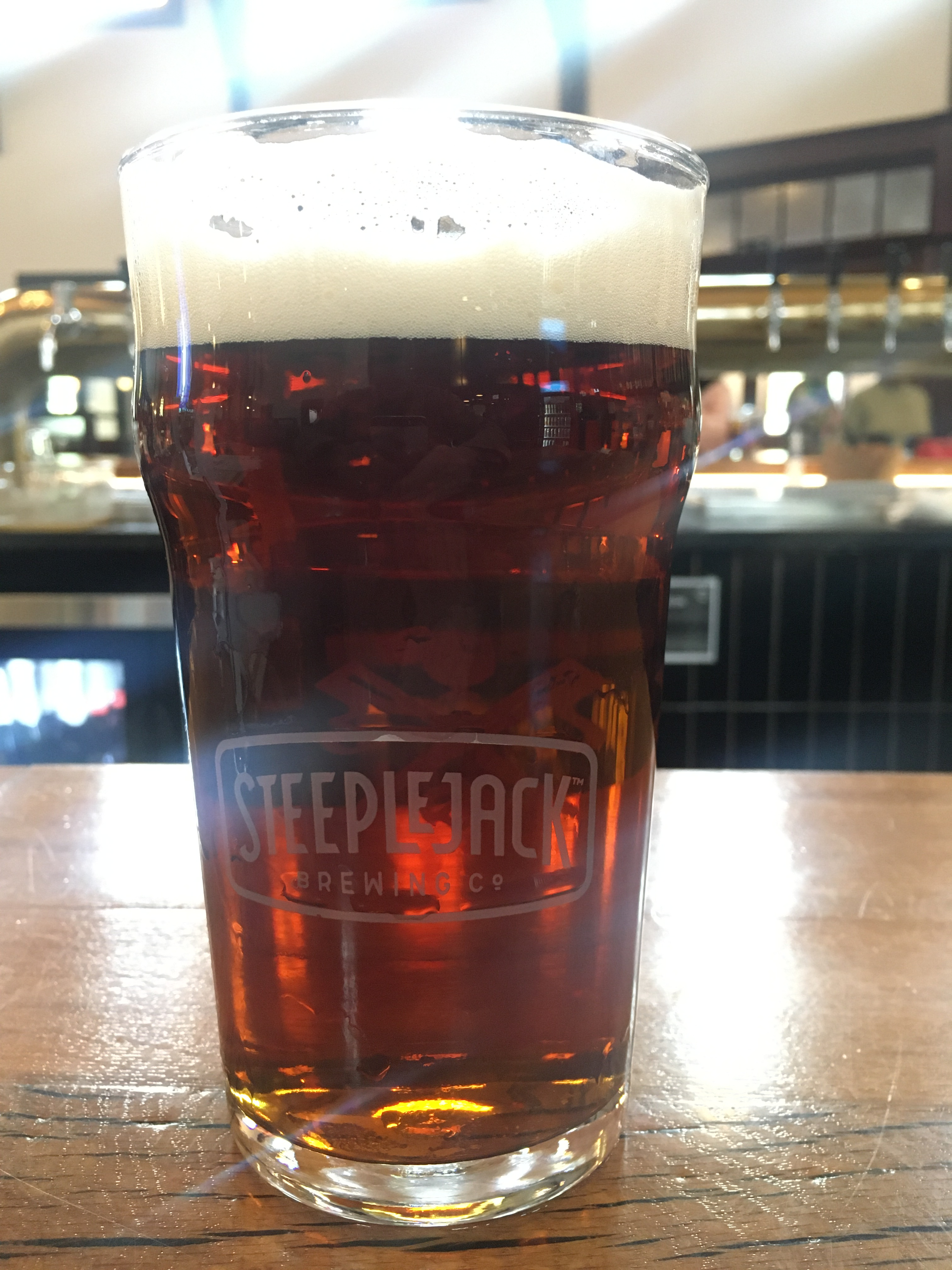
A pint of Kentucky Common beer at Steeplejack Brewing in Portland, Oregon

Kentucky common beer is a once-popular style of ale from the area in and around Louisville, Kentucky from the 1850s until Prohibition. This style is rarely brewed commercially today. It was also locally known as dark cream common beer, cream beer or common beer. The beer was top-fermented and was krausened up to 10% making it quite highly carbonated. Like cream ale, it was consumed fresh, usually as draught beer. In 1913 it was estimated that 80% of the beer consumed in Louisville was of this type. Many local breweries made only this style of beer.

== History ==
Before modern refrigeration, most breweries depended on ice cut the previous winter for producing beer. The Louisville area usually did not have the weather conditions to produce enough ice for this. With an influx of European immigrants into Louisville during the mid-19th century, there was an increased demand for beer in the area. Common beer was fermented at higher temperatures like an ale, but was aged for a very short period of time if at all before being consumed, thus eliminating any need to keep it cool. (Compare California common beer or "steam beer", which has similar origins due to the lack of refrigeration.) This kept overhead costs down and made it inexpensive to purchase, so it was very popular among working-class people. Assumptions that Kentucky Common was a sour beer are based on the description of the style written in 1906 however, based on brewing records, the mash lengths and hopping rates would have made sour mashing impossible as Lactobacillus delbruekii and Lactobacillus hordei used in sour mashing are both hop sensitive, lacking the HorA gene. Nonetheless, in the same work, the bacteria identified in the beer was identified as “rod shaped”, which would indicate Lactobacillus, but it would more likely have been Lactobacillus plantarum, which is hop tolerant and inhabits contaminated cooperage. The slight souring would have been incidental, even if widespread, and not a defining feature of the style.

As of 2014, this style is not generally available, though there are occasional attempts at revival. New Albanian Brewing Company produces one as Phoenix Kentucky Komon, Local Option from Chicago produces their own Kentucky common ale, Avenues Proper in Salt Lake City occasionally brews a Kentucky common ale called Bluegrass Brown, Abe Erb brewed a one-off, called Yee Haw Magee Kentucky Common, and the revived Falls City Brewing Company is serving their own version, called Kentucky Common, at its brew house. Darkness Brewing from Bellevue, Kentucky brews a Kentucky common called Bellevue Common. Upstate Brewing Company in New York has one, named Common Sense, and Keg & Lantern in Brooklyn brews Commie's Kentucky Common. Iron Duke Brewery of Ludlow, Massachusetts produces one, named The Common. Ten Mile Brewing in Signal Hill, California also brews one called Hidden Hollow. Level Crossing Brewing in Salt Lake City, UT brews a Kentucky Common called You-Tah Uncommon. Sawstone Brewing Co. in Morehead, Kentucky brews Kentucky Common. Ferguson Brewing Company in Ferguson, MO (metro St. Louis) brews one called Kentucky Common, Tampa Bay Brewing Company in Tampa, Florida brews one called Kentucky Uncommon. As of 9/2/2023, Shadow Puppet Brewing in Livermore, CA (in the San Francisco Bay Area) is brewing Kentucky Uncommon, an American amber ale. Steeplejack Brewing Company in Portland, Oregon brews a Kentucky Common, which they serve on draft and as a cask ale. In April 2024 Four Fathers Brewing in Ontario brewed a one-off called Saloon Monsoon. Ghost Brewing Company in Bay Shore, New York make a Kentucky Common called Afterlife. It has a cherry cola finish. Hops Brewery in Los Ranchos de Albuquerque brews Dad Joke, a Kentucky common, year-round. Dispensaire microbrewery in Montreal, Quebec brews Derby Draft. Crusader Brewing, located in Bakersfield, California, produces a Kentucky common beer known as Commoner, which is available fresh on tap. Trellis Brewing in Louisville, Kentucky often has "Actually", a Kentucky Common, on tap or canned. It is a medium amber/caramel with smooth flavor and minor bitter/sour finish.

In 2021, the Brewers Association added the style to its updated 2021 Beer Style Guidelines.

== Characteristics ==
This kind of beer was usually made with 6 row barley, approximately 25 to 30 percent corn grits and 1 to 2 percent each caramel or caramel malts and black malt to counteract the high bicarbonate water. It had an original gravity of 1.040-1.050, an average bitterness of 27 IBU. The beer was typically kegged and served relatively young, with a short time of 6 to 8 days from mash in to keg. The beer is an easy-drinking, slightly sweet, dark amber to light brown ale.
