= Anchor Brewing Company =

Microbrewery in San Francisco, California

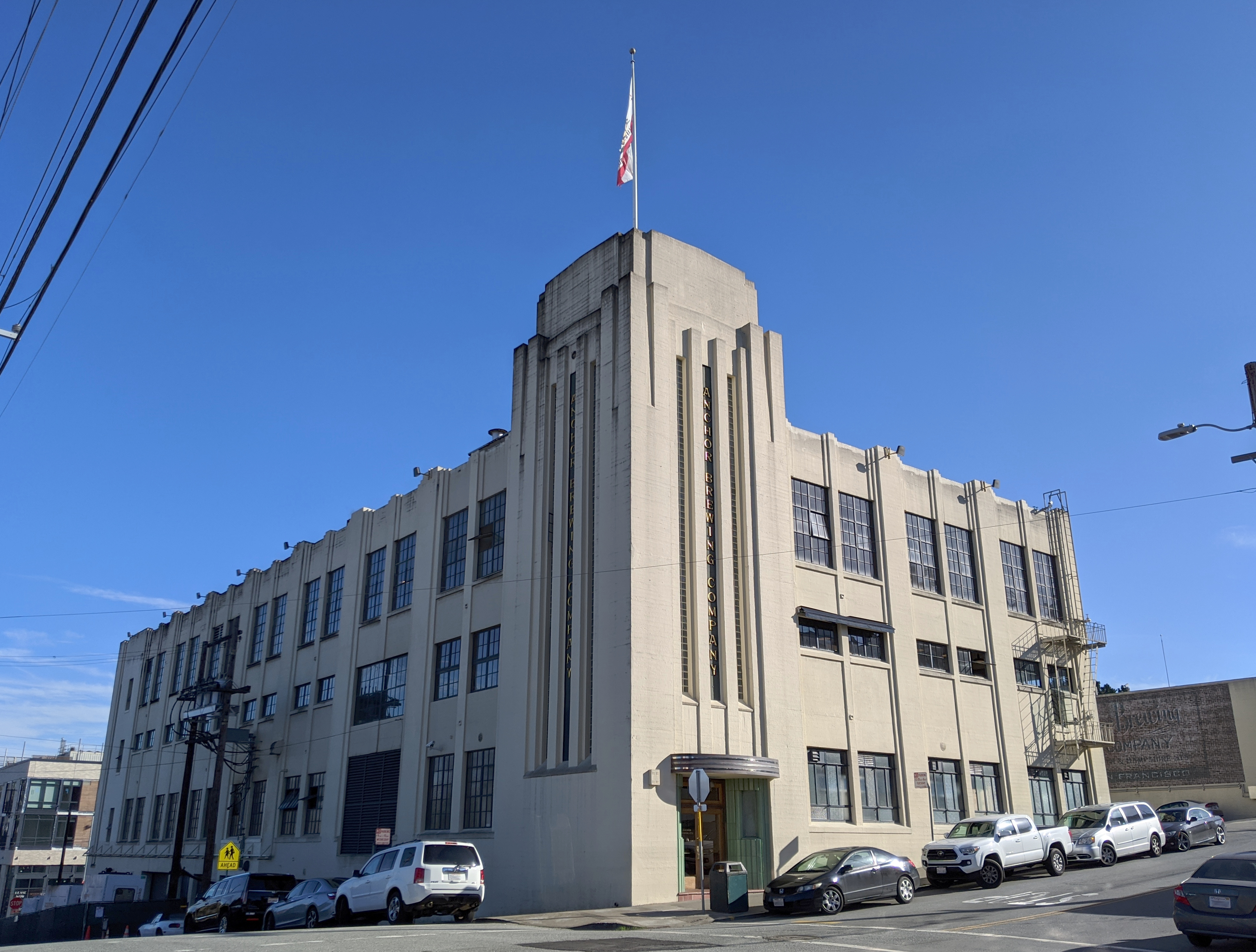
- The Anchor Brewing Company building on Potrero Hill in 2020
- Type: Subsidiary
- Industry: Alcoholic beverages
- Founded: 1896; 130 years ago
- Founder: Ernst F. Baruth; Otto Schinkel, Jr.
- Defunct: 2023
- Headquarters: Potrero Hill, San Francisco, California, United States; 37.7636°N 122.4005°W
- Area served: Worldwide
- Key people: Frederick Louis Maytag III; Joseph Kraus; August Meyer; Henry Tietjen; Mark Carpenter; Joe Allen; Jim Glowner; Lawrence Steese
- Products: Beer
- Production output: 132,000 barrels (2013)
- Parent: Shepherd Futures
- Website: anchorbrewing.com

Anchor Brewing Company was a brewery on Potrero Hill in San Francisco, California. Founded in 1896, the brewery underwent several changes in location and ownership throughout its history. After years of declining sales due to competition with larger breweries, Anchor was purchased by Frederick Louis "Fritz" Maytag III in 1965, preventing its closure. The brewery operated at its Potrero Hill location from 1979 and was one of the last remaining producers of steam beer, a variety of beer trademarked by the company.

In 2010, the company was purchased by The Griffin Group, an investment and consulting company focused on alcohol brands, and became part of Anchor Brewers & Distillers, LLC.

In 2017, the company was acquired by Sapporo Breweries for US$85 million. Sapporo's ownership oversaw significant declines in revenue for the brewery, and in 2023, Anchor Brewing ceased operations, with plans to liquidate the business. In July 2023, Anchor Brewing closed, and its workers attempted to buy out the firm as a worker-owned cooperative. Instead, on May 31, 2024, Chobani CEO Hamdi Ulukaya announced that he was buying the company and its associated assets. He said that he planned to restart the company and keep its operations in San Francisco.

== History ==
=== Early brewing ===
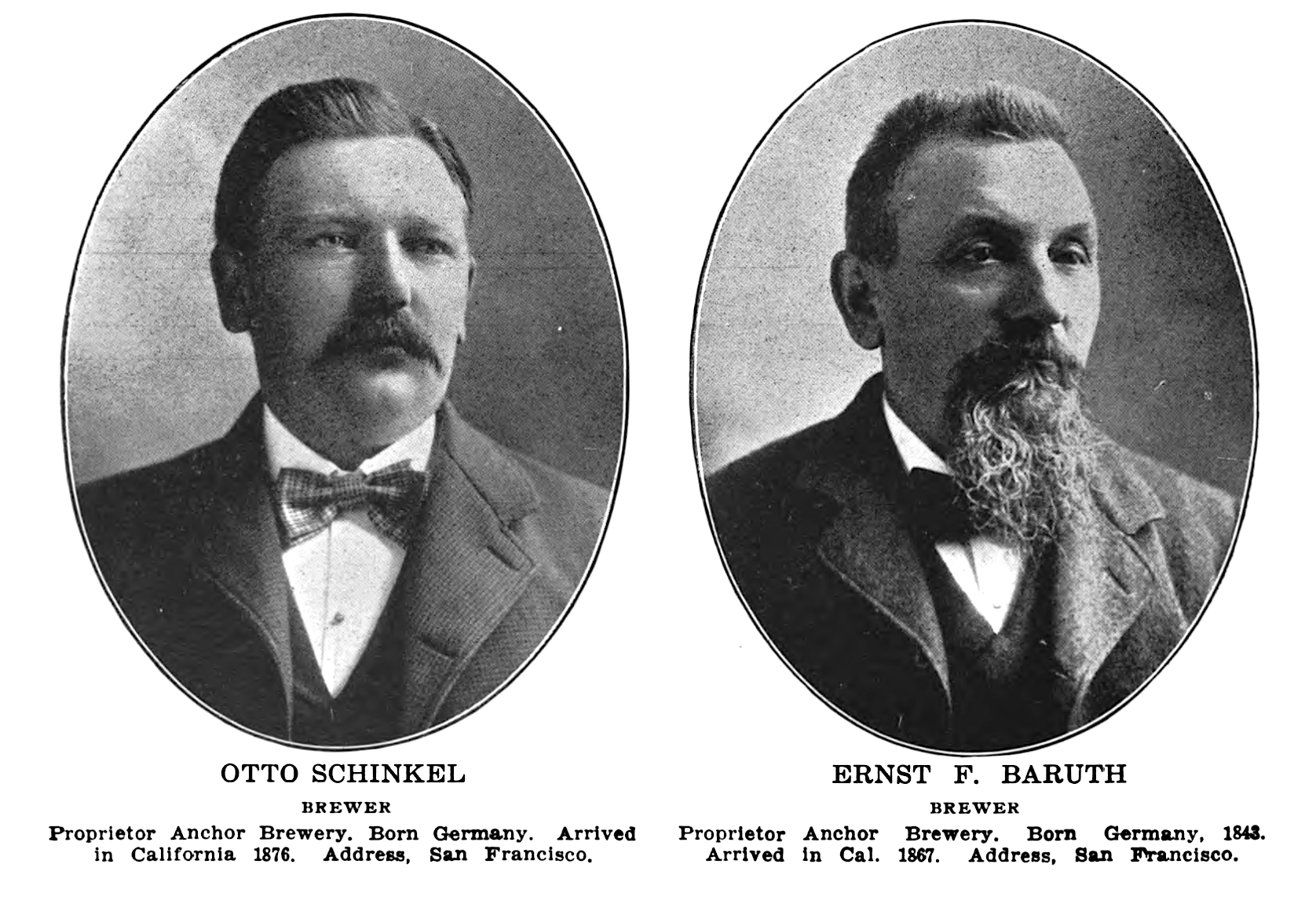
Otto Schinkel and Ernst F. Baruth

The brewery that would become Anchor was built during the California Gold Rush when Gottlieb Brekle arrived from Germany and began brewing steam beer in San Francisco. In 1896, Ernst F. Baruth and his son-in-law, Otto Schinkel Jr., bought the old brewery, creating Anchor Brewing. This original location was completely destroyed in the fires that engulfed San Francisco following the 1906 earthquake. It was rebuilt at a different location in 1907. After the deaths of Baruth and Schinkel, the brewery was run by Joseph Kraus and August Meyer until Prohibition forced the brewery to shut down. There is no record of what Anchor did during Prohibition, but it resumed operations at a new location once Prohibition in California came to an end in 1933. However, the new location burned down in 1944, with Kraus reopening Anchor at another location the same year.

The brewery continued operations through the 1950s, but suffered heavily from the country's increasingly strong preference for beers produced by mega-breweries. While there had been more than 4,000 breweries at the turn of the twentieth century, shifts in the industry due to Prohibition and the consolidation of brewing companies meant that only 70 remained by the 1960s. As a result of declining sales, Anchor shut down in 1959, but was bought and reopened the following year at a new location by Lawrence Steese.

=== Purchase by Maytag ===
By 1965, the brewery was once again suffering from poor sales. The quality of Anchor's beer had deteriorated under Steese due to a lack of expertise, lack of proper equipment, and poor sanitation standards, which prevented the consistent production of a commercially viable product. The brewery gained a reputation for producing sour beer, and convincing existing distributors to continue to sell the beer became a challenge.

In 1965, Frederick Louis "Fritz" Maytag III bought the brewery, saving it from closure. Maytag purchased 51% of the brewery for a few thousand dollars, and purchased the brewery outright in 1969. By 1971, the brewery began to bottle steam beer (along with other varieties of beer, most notably a Christmas ale) under Maytag's direction. He purchased an old coffee roastery on Potrero Hill to serve as Anchor's new location in 1979. This building serves as the current location of the brewery.

Turning the failing brewery around required more money than Maytag had from his inherited fortune from the Maytag Company. Between the initial purchase of Anchor and producing the first batches of bottled beer in 1971, Maytag had to learn the brewing process from scratch, invest in new equipment, and improve sanitation in the brewing process. The result was a new beer that was a definitive representative of California common beer, but a derivative to the historic steam beer manufactured by Anchor through the previous century.

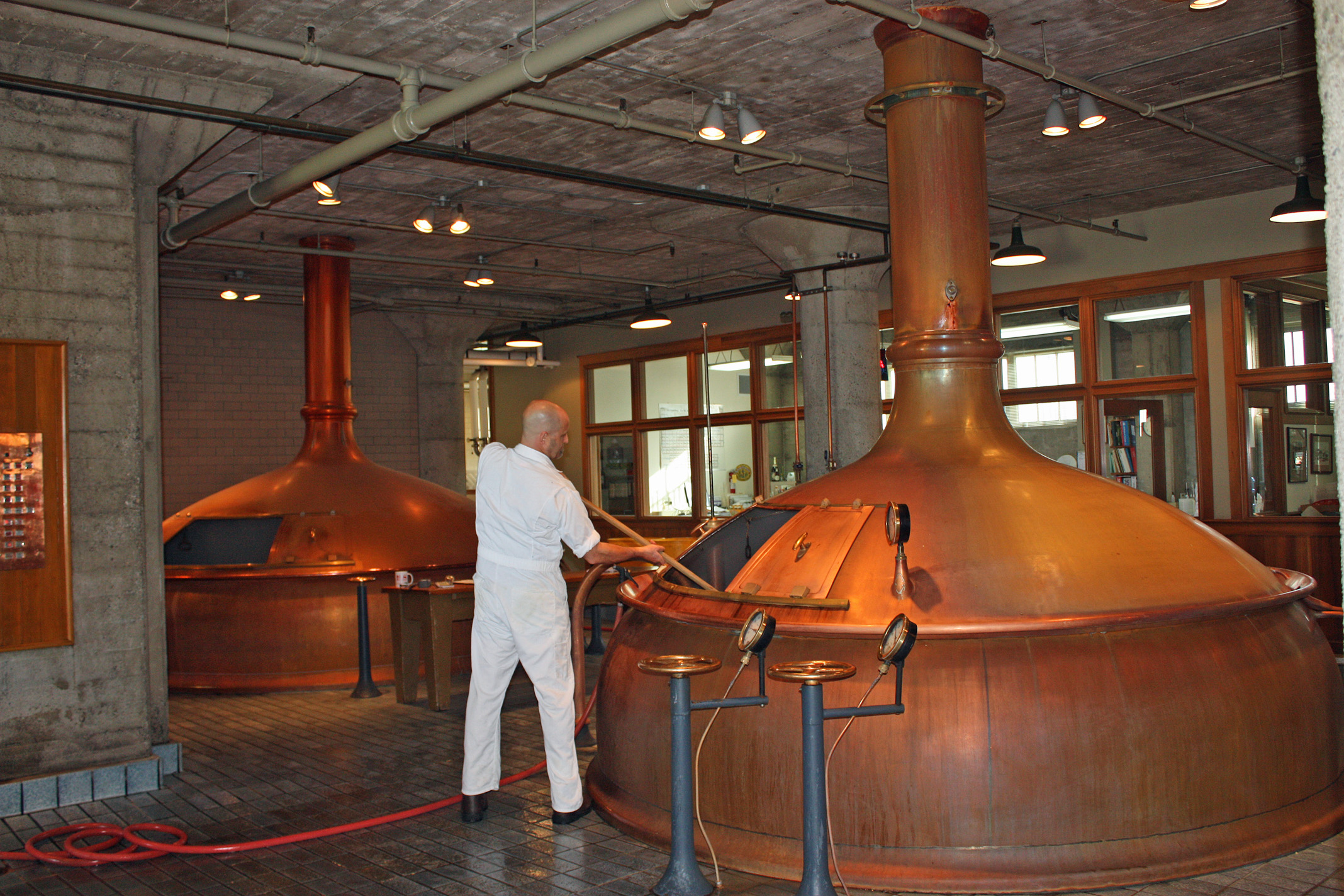
Stirring hops into the wort in the brewhouse

Before offering in bottles, sales were only as draft beer to thirty local establishments that had long carried the brand. Total production was only 800 barrels in 1969, 1,200 in 1970, and 2,100 in 1971. The bottles were initially sold in four-packs, to keep the price close to mainstream six-packs.

=== Growth and development ===
Due to its sale at many local establishments, Anchor's steam beer was well known in the San Francisco area, having a reputation of local importance that grew under Maytag's ownership. In 1977, Arnold Schwarzenegger portrayed an Anchor Brewing employee in an episode of Streets of San Francisco, with Fritz Maytag making a cameo as another employee. During the 1980s, Anchor's Steam Beer began to gain national attention and demand increased. Anchor ultimately served as an early example of a microbrewery, being among the first American breweries to produce porters, barley wine, and India pale ales with regularity. Its success both regionally and nationally inspired others to enter the brewing business, notably New Albion.

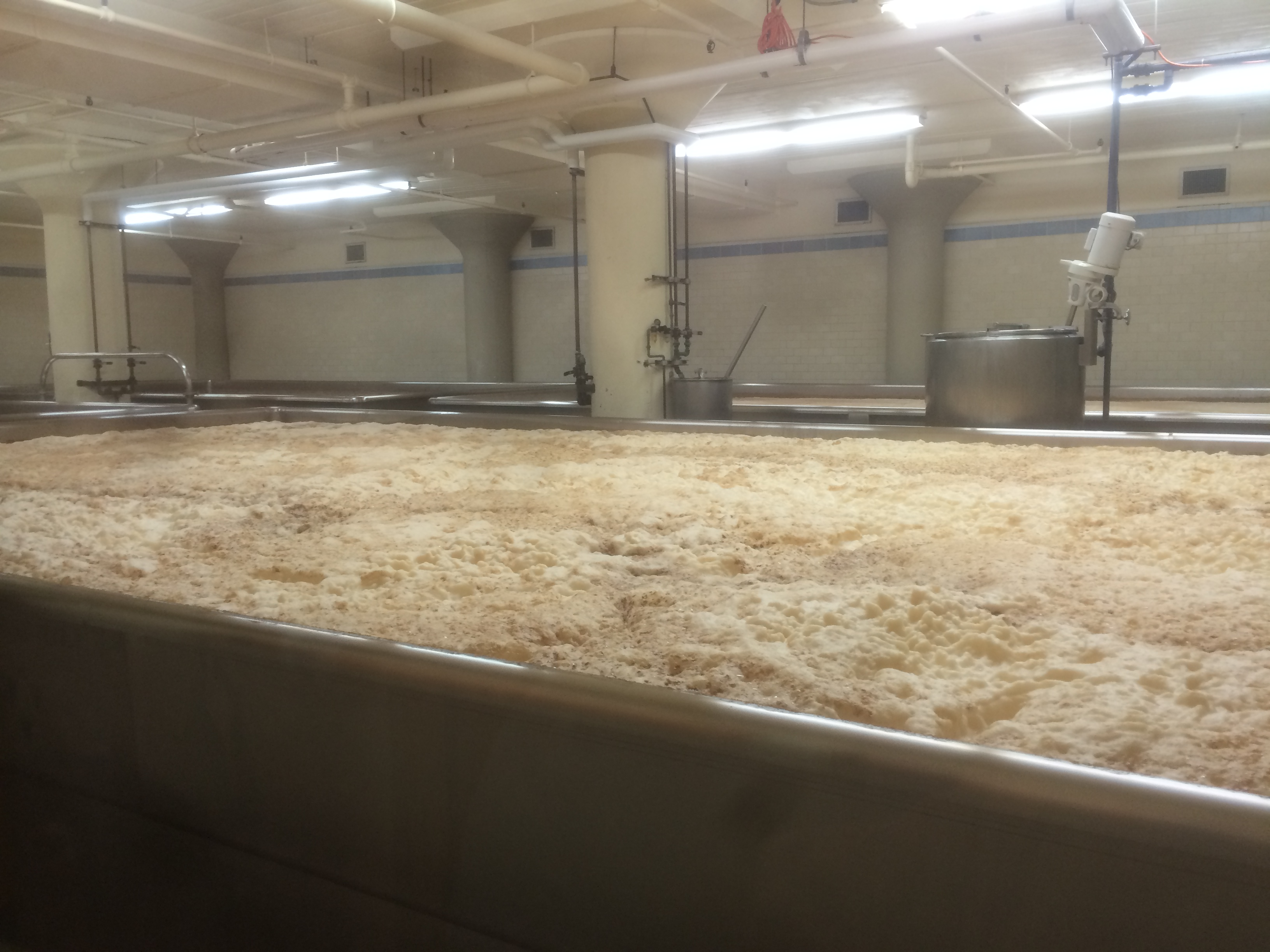
Open-top fermentation tanks are used

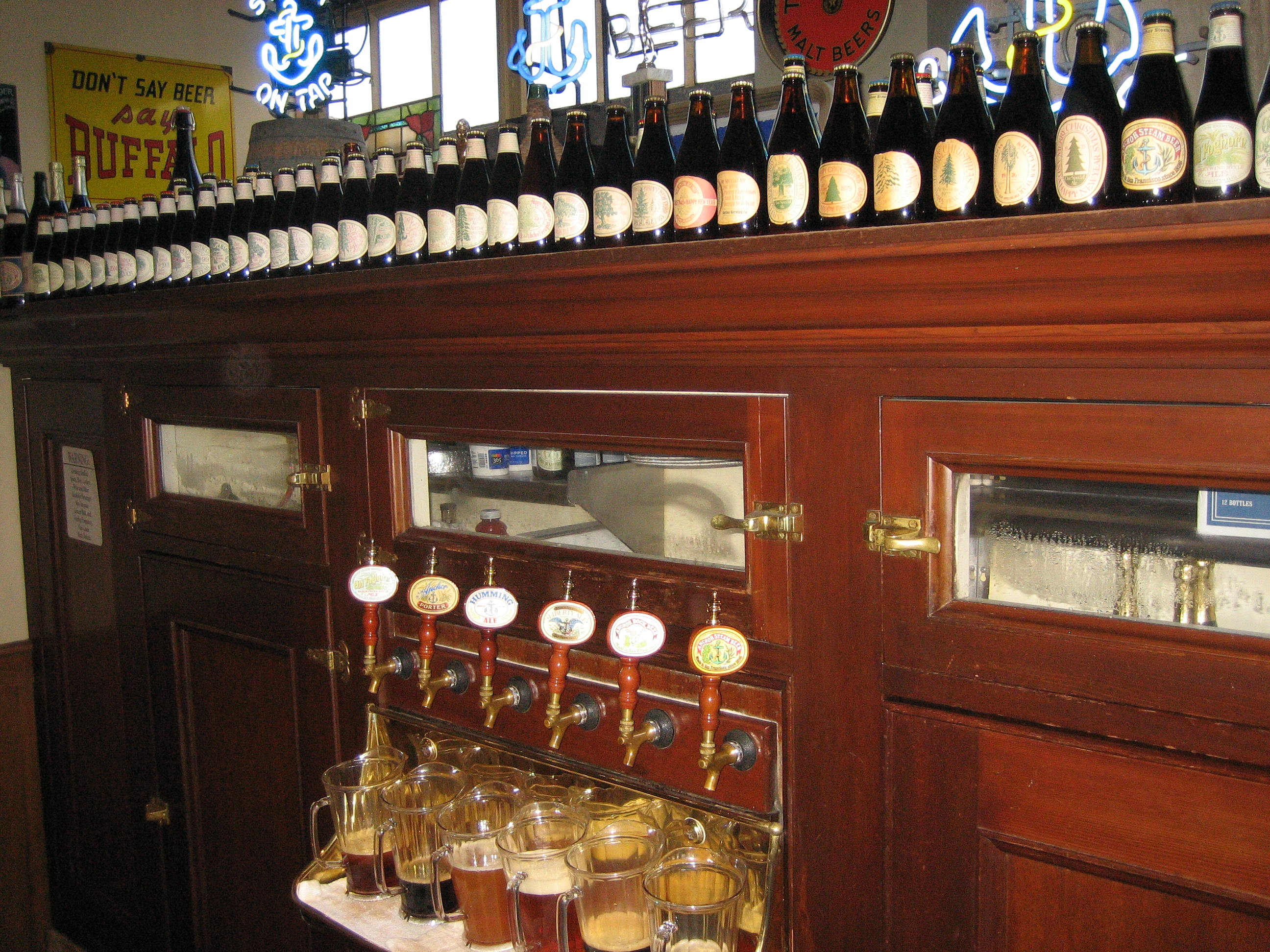
The brewery offers tours. Above the beer taps is a row of Christmas Ale bottles, one from each year beginning in 1975.

In 1989, the company produced a limited beer named Ninkasi, based on a 4000-year-old Sumerian recipe found in an ode to the Sumerian goddess of beer known as the “Hymn to Ninkasi.” The recipe started with a twice-baked bread known as bappir as well as malt and was sweetened with honey and dates. It did not include hops or other bittering ingredients, making it considerably sweeter than modern beers. The recipe is described by Charlie Papazian. Also in 1989, the brewing process for a batch of beer was interrupted during the Loma Prieta earthquake. The resulting (altered) brew was released as normal Anchor Steam, but with an inverted label; this beer has come to be referred to as Earthquake Beer.

In 1993, the company opened Anchor Distillery, a microdistillery in the same location as the brewery, and began making a single malt rye whiskey, named Old Potrero, after the hill on which the brewery stands. In 1997, the microdistillery began producing a gin, called Junípero—Spanish for juniper, and a reference to Fr. Junípero Serra, an important figure in San Francisco's and California's history. The distillery also produces a Jenever style gin called Genevieve, using wheat, barley, rye, and the same herbal ingredients as their Junípero gin.

In 2010, Maytag sold the company to former Skyy vodka executives Keith Greggor and Tony Foglio, from Novato, California, who planned to expand Anchor's business while keeping its commitment to artisan brewing. In 2013, the brewery launched Anchor California Lager, a re-creation of a historic Boca Brewing lager from the 1870s. The brewery also announced a major expansion plan at Pier 48 in the Mission Rock neighborhood near Oracle Park, which would expand Anchor's maximum annual production capacity from 180,000 barrels to 680,000 barrels.

In 2014, Anchor officially announced Anchor IPA, the first India Pale Ale in the brewery's history. Anchor ended production of its winter seasonal Bock in 2014 and replaced it a year later with Anchor Winter Wheat.

=== Purchase by Sapporo and unionization ===
In 2017, Anchor was purchased by Sapporo for $85 million. Working conditions and pay at Anchor had been in a state of decline since Maytag had sold the company, and this trend continued under Sapporo's ownership despite the company's larger holdings. This led to further dissatisfaction among the brewery's workers. In 2018, several workers at Anchor, among them Brace Belden, formed an organizing committee and coordinated with the DSA chapter in San Francisco to develop a plan for unionization with the International Longshore and Warehouse Union. The unionization efforts were overwhelmingly supported by local bars which served Anchor Steam Beer in the city.

In 2019, Anchor Brewing workers voted by an almost 2-to-1 margin to join the International Longshore and Warehouse Union making Anchor Brewing – including Anchor Public Taps, the brewery's on-site brew pub – the first unionized craft brewery in the United States. The three-year union contract was officially ratified in 2020, providing workers with increased wages, health insurance, and other benefits.

In 2021, Anchor Brewing announced a major makeover of their logo and beer labels. On the eve of their 125th birthday, the brewery replaced their vintage-looking labels with a large Anchor logo in a two-tone color schemes per beer. Most labels were not changed in decades or at all. The design change was met with criticism by consumers.

=== Announced closure ===
In 2023, union efforts to renew the existing contract were stalled, with Sapporo delaying negotiations. Soon after, Anchor announced it would no longer distribute nationally and would cease production of its signature Christmas Ale.

On July 12, 2023, Sapporo announced it was ceasing operations at Anchor and liquidating the business. Sapporo blamed the closure on decreased sales at restaurants and bars caused by the COVID-19 pandemic, competition from other local brewers, and a shift in consumer preferences to alcoholic beverages other than beer. Employees were given a 60-day WARN notice on July 12. The announcement led to significant outrage from brewery workers, San Francisco bartenders, and locals, with passing drivers chanting "keep brewing" outside the building.

A spokesman for Sapporo quoted by The New York Times said that the firm sought a buyer for Anchor before announcing that the brewery would close, and that it was still possible one might emerge. To liquidate Anchor, Sapporo has elected to enter into an alternative to the traditional bankruptcy process known as "Assignments for the Benefit of Creditors". Through the process, an "assignee" other than Sapporo will assume stewardship of Anchor and consider bids for the company's assets. Through this process, a new owner might emerge.

In July 2023, Anchor Brewing closed, and its workers attempted to buy out the firm as a worker-owned cooperative. Instead, the founder and CEO of Chobani bought out the company in 2024, with the intention of restarting its operations.

=== Purchase by Chobani founder ===
On May 31, 2024, it was announced that the brewery would be purchased by the founder of Chobani and re-opened. In February 2025, the new ownership group received the Alcoholic Beverage Control permit required to brew, import, and wholesale beer, as well as import and wholesale wine and spirits. However, one year after the announcement, no additional action had been taken.

== Former products ==
Anchor had a year-round range of seven beers, as well as several seasonal beers. In 2012, Anchor introduced the Zymaster series, which placed an emphasis on brewing tradition. These beers were generally of an extremely limited nature.

=== Core beers ===
Name	Alcohol by volume	Style	First brewed
Anchor Steam	4.8%	Steam beer	1896
Anchor Small	3.3%	Small beer	1997 (Retired)
Liberty Ale	5.9%	American pale ale	1975
Anchor Porter	5.6%	Porter	1972
Old Foghorn	8–10%	Barley wine	1975
Brekle's Brown	6.0%	Brown ale	2010 (Retired)
Anchor California Lager	4.9%	American lager	2012
Humming Ale	5.9%	Export ale	2009 (Retired)
Anchor IPA	6.5%	India pale ale	2013
Our Barrel Ale	6.5%	Barrel-aged beer	2009

=== Seasonal beers ===
Name	Alcohol by volume	Style	Availability	First brewed
Winter Wheat	7%	Wheat beer	November–January	2015 (Retired)
Saison	7.2%	Saison	February–April	2014 (Retired)
Summer Wheat	4.5%	Wheat beer	May–July	1984 (Retired)
BigLeaf Maple Autumn Red	6%	Red ale	August–October	2013 (Retired)
Christmas Ale (a.k.a. Our Special Ale)	5–7%	Christmas beer	November–February	1975 (Retired)

=== Zymaster Series ===
- No. 1: California Lager
- No. 2: Mark's Mild
- No. 3: Flying Cloud San Francisco Stout
- No. 4: Fort Ross Farmhouse Ale
- No. 5: Harvest One American Pale Ale
- No. 6: Saaremaa Ale
- No. 7: Potrero Hill Sour Mash IPA
- No. 8: Luxardo Cherry Ale

== See also ==
- California breweries
- Barrel-aged beer
