= Maytag Dairy Farms =

American manufacturer of blue cheese

Maytag Dairy Farms logo

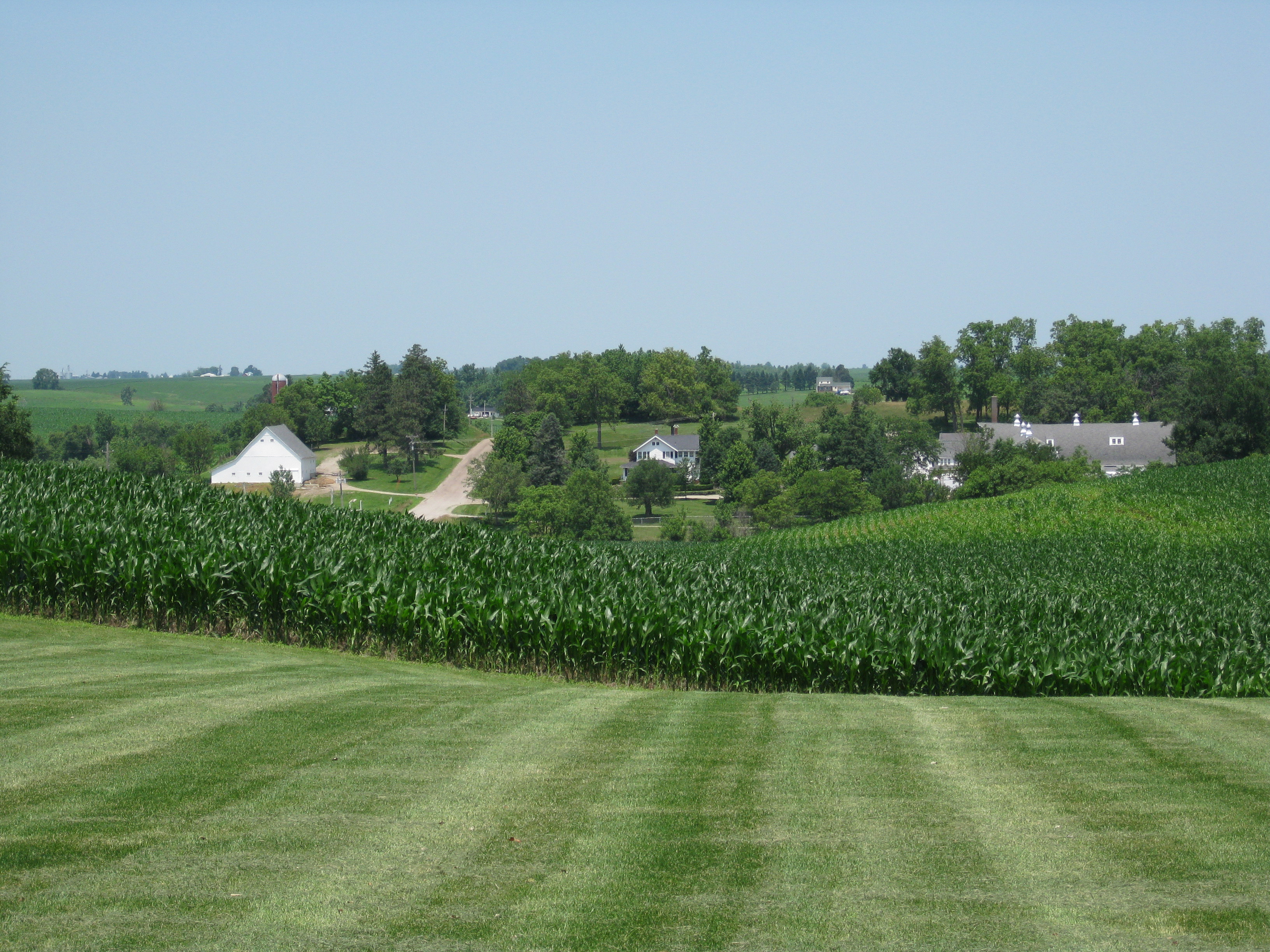
View of the Maytag Dairy Farms from the visitor center

Maytag Dairy Farms is a blue cheese manufacturer and farm based in Newton, Iowa. It is known for the product Maytag Blue cheese.

== History ==
In 1919, Elmer Henry Maytag purchased a cow to provide milk for his family. He grew this into a business by raising a small herd of Holstein-Friesian cows, supplying milk to his community. His cows went on to win multiple awards at livestock shows across the United States.

Upon his death in 1940, his sons Frederick Louis Maytag II and Robert Maytag took over the farm, and Frederick became president of the Maytag Appliance Corporation. The brothers established Maytag Dairy Farms in 1941 to produce an American blue cheese made from cow's milk. Collaborations with dairy researchers at Iowa State University led to the forming of the first wheels of Maytag Blue Cheese in October 1941. The production method was designed to create a flavor profile similar to European blue cheeses. According to the Maytag family, the company was an early adopter of mail-order delivery for its cheese products.

Fred's son, Fritz Maytag, served as chairman emeritus of the company.

Maytag Dairy Farms was family-owned until 2019, when Midwest Growth Partners, a private equity fund manager, acquired the firm. In July 2022, AgCertain Industries purchased Maytag Dairy Farms from Midwest Growth Partners.

== See also ==
- List of dairy product companies in the United States
