= Maytag Florence plant =

- Built: 1989
- Operated: 1989–2006
- Location: 1500 Range Way Drive; Florence, South Carolina, United States
- Coordinates: 34°14′24″N 79°47′25″W
- Industry: Home appliances
- Products: top-load washing machines
- Area: 92 acres (37 ha)
- Volume: 422,000 square feet (39,200 m^{2})
- Owner: Maytag Corporation

Maytag Florence plant was an appliance manufacturing plant in Florence, South Carolina, owned by Maytag Corporation. The facility was closed in 2006.

== History ==
The facility was originally built and opened in July 1989 as a $40 million assembly plant by Caloric Corporation, which relocated its cooking equipment operations from Topton, Pennsylvania in 1991. In 1993, it was acquired by Amana Corporation (then a subsidiary of Raytheon) to produce cooking and range products.

In 2001, Maytag acquired Amana (including the Florence plant). Later, they began producing the high-efficiency Neptune TL (top-load) washer at the plant in 2003.

On November 7, 2005, Maytag announced it will close the Florence, South Carolina, manufacturing plant, affecting about 60 employees as part of an effort to reduce excess manufacturing capacity. The plant shut down in early 2006.

In January 2007, Whirlpool sold the plant to Hackman Capital Partners, LLC of Los Angeles, California.
