= Maytag Galesburg plant =

- Operated: 1905–2004
- Location: 1801 Monmouth Boulevard; Galesburg, Illinois, United States
- Coordinates: 40°56′9″N 90°24′4″W
- Industry: Home appliances
- Products: refrigerators
- Employees: 1,600 (2002)
- Volume: 2,000,000 square feet (190,000 m^{2})
- Owner: Maytag Corporation
- Defunct: September 16, 2004

The Maytag Galesburg plant was an appliance manufacturing plant in Galesburg, Illinois, owned by Maytag Corporation. The facility was closed in 2004.

== History ==
The facility traces back to 1905 with Midwest Manufacturing, later operated by the Admiral Corporation, before Maytag acquired it in 1986 from Magic Chef, which acquired the site from Admiral in the late 1970s.

In 1988, Maytag invested $100 million to modernize its refrigeration plant, producing its first own-branded refrigerator here in 1989. The company upgraded the plant in 1994.

On October 11, 2002, Maytag announced it will close its Galesburg, Illinois, refrigerator manufacturing plant by 2004, shifting production to a new facility in Reynosa, Tamaulipas, Mexico. The factory shut down on September 16, 2004 the termination of 1,600 workers, ending 52 years of refrigerator manufacturing in the city.

In 2007, Whirlpool sold the Galesburg plant along with the four Maytag properties.

In January 2008, Whirlpool announced it will close the Reynosa, Mexico, refrigerator manufacturing plant.
