= Maytag Toy Racer =

Maytag Toy Racer

The Maytag Toy Racer was a series of small one-passenger automobiles built by the Maytag Company between October 11, 1934 and December 1, 1941 for promotional purposes.

The toy racer was powered by Maytag Model 92 one-cylinder or, later, two-cylinder air-cooled Multi-Motor engines. Previously in 1932 the Winston Corporation of Joliet, Illinois made a toy racer powered by the Maytag Multi-Motor.

Many of the toy racers were sold to Maytag dealers who raced in small groups to advertise their brand. These Winston racers were sometimes also called Maytag Toy Racers

Early versions of the Maytag Toy Racer used a Model 92 Maytag Multi-motor for power and a cone clutch for power transmission. Later models used a double-purpose hand lever to adjust drive-belt friction and to apply braking action. Maytag Toy racers manufactured beginning in October 1937 used the Model 72, twin cylinder, Maytag Multi-motor.

Records show that 498 Maytag Toy Racers were built, and approximately 25 survivors have been located to date.
