= Maytag Searcy plant =

- Operated: 1970–2006
- Location: 200 Queensway Street; Searcy, Arkansas, United States
- Coordinates: 35°14′14″N 91°43′18″W
- Industry: Home appliances
- Products: top-load washing machines; clothes dryers
- Employees: 700 (2006)
- Volume: 275,000 square feet (25,500 m^{2})
- Owner: Maytag Corporation

Maytag Searcy plant was an appliance manufacturing plant in Searcy, Arkansas, owned by Maytag Corporation. The plant produced washing machines and clothes dryers. The facility was closed in 2006 by Whirlpool Corporation, which acquired Maytag in the same year.

== History ==
The facility was opened in 1970 by the McGraw-Edison Company (which owns Speed Queen before selling it to Raytheon in 1979), then operated by Amana. In 1998, officials had announced a doubling of the facility's original 165,000 square feet (15,300 m^{2}) footprint to reach this size, with plans to increase employment up to 800 people. In 2001, Maytag Corporation purchased the Amana appliance business (including the Searcy, Arkansas, laundry manufacturing plant) from Goodman Global Holdings for $325 million.

At the Searcy facility, Maytag manufactured both Amana models and rebranded budget washers, which were marketed as Maytag-branded "Legacy Series" machines.

On May 10, 2006, Whirlpool announced it will close the Maytag laundry manufacturing plant in Searcy, Arkansas by 2007, along with their other laundry plants in Newton, Iowa and Herrin, Illinois, as part of a plan to eliminate 4,500 jobs following their merger with Maytag. The plant was closed on December 18 of the year.

In January 2007, Whirlpool sold the plant to the Industrial Realty Group (IRG) along with other sites in Illinois, Iowa, and West Virginia.

== See also ==
- Maytag Newton plant
- Maytag Herrin plant
