= Steam beer =

Beer style

Steam beer, also known as California common beer, is made by fermenting lager yeast at a higher than normal temperature.

Historically steam beer came from Bavaria, Germany, but it is now associated with San Francisco and the West Coast of the United States. It was an improvised process, originating out of necessity, and was considered a cheap, low-quality beer, as shown by references to it in literature of the 1890s and 1900s.

Modern steam beer originated with the Anchor Brewing Company, which trademarked the term in 1981 (and ceased operations in 2023). Although the modern company had corporate continuity with a small brewery which made beer since the 1890s, Anchor Steam was a modern craft-brewed lager. The company did not claim any close similarity between its present-day product and turn-of-the-20th-century steam beer.

== Etymology ==
There have been various explanations for the use of the name "steam beer". According to Anchor Brewing, the name "steam" came from the fact that the brewery had no way to effectively chill the boiling wort using traditional means. So they pumped the hot wort up to large, shallow, open-top bins on the roof of the brewery so that it would be rapidly chilled by the cool air blowing in off the Pacific Ocean. Thus while brewing, the brewery had a distinct cloud of steam around the roof let off by the wort as it cooled, hence the name. Another explanation is that the carbon dioxide pressure produced by the 19th-century steam-beer-making process was very high, and that it may have been necessary as part of the process to let off "steam" before attempting to dispense the beer. It is also possible that the name or brewing process derive from Dampfbier (literally steam beer), a traditional German beer that was also fermented at unusually high temperatures and that may have been known to 19th-century American brewers, many of whom were of German descent; Dampfbier is an ale, however, not a lager.

== Brewing process ==
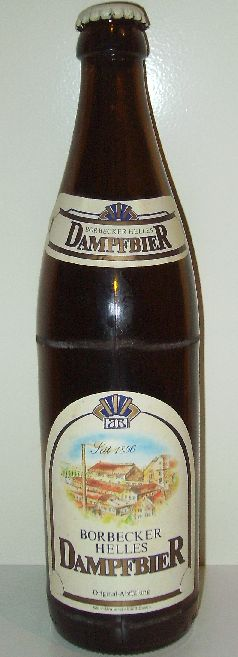
German Dampfbier

In 19th-century California, brewers found a strain of lager yeast which would ferment at higher temperatures.

The flavor of beer is influenced by the strain of yeast and the fermentation temperature. Lager yeast is best used at temperatures from 48 to 58 °F (9 to 14 °C). Classic lagering of beers takes place over a period of time from weeks to many months at a temperature of 37 °F (3 °C). Conversely, ale yeast is best used at temperatures from 55 to 75 °F (13 to 24 °C). Fermentation by ale yeasts produces a beer that has a more distinct flavor. Steam Beer uses bottom fermenting lager yeasts at ale temperatures, which results in a very distinctive flavor profile that includes both ale and lager characteristics.

While steam beer is considered a specialty microbrew style of beer today, it was originally a cheap beer made for blue collar workers. Wahl and Heinus's American Handy Book of Brewing and Malting (1902) describes California Steam Beer as “a very clear, refreshing drink, much consumed by the laboring classes", and while most modern California common beers are all-barley malt, adjuncts were often used in the early days. Malt, grits, or raw cereals of any kind, and sugars, especially glucose, were added in the kettle and roasted malt or sugar coloring used to give the amber color of Munich beer.

== In literature ==
Jack London refers to steam beer in his "alcoholic memoir", John Barleycorn, in a passage explaining how he started drinking in late-1880s San Francisco:

The first day I worked in the bowling alley, the barkeeper, according to custom, called us boys up to have a drink after we had been setting up pins for several hours. The others asked for beer. I said I'd take ginger ale. The boys snickered, and I noticed the barkeeper favoured me with a strange, searching scrutiny. Nevertheless, he opened a bottle of ginger ale. Afterward, back in the alleys, in the pauses between games, the boys enlightened me. I had offended the barkeeper. A bottle of ginger ale cost the saloon ever so much more than a glass of steam beer; and it was up to me, if I wanted to hold my job, to drink beer.

As a budding writer, "a wild band of young revolutionists invited me as the guest of honour to a beer bust" and was challenged to a drinking contest.

I'd show them, the young rascals.... These unlicked cubs who thought they could out-drink me! Faugh! It was steam beer. I had learned more expensive brews. Not for years had I drunk steam beer...

Frank Norris's 1899 novel McTeague, set in San Francisco, sets the stage with a reference to steam beer in its opening paragraph:

It was Sunday, and, according to his custom on that day, McTeague took his dinner at two in the afternoon at the car conductors' coffee-joint on Polk Street. He had a thick gray soup; heavy, underdone meat, very hot, on a cold plate; two kinds of vegetables; and a sort of suet pudding, full of strong butter and sugar. On his way back to his office, one block above, he stopped at Joe Frenna's saloon and bought a pitcher of steam beer. It was his habit to leave the pitcher there on his way to dinner.... By and by, gorged with steam beer, and overcome by the heat of the room, the cheap tobacco, and the effects of his heavy meal, he dropped off to sleep.

When he marries, his wife convinces him to adopt more refined habits:

She broke him of the habit of eating with his knife, she caused him to substitute bottled beer in the place of steam beer, and she induced him to take off his hat to Miss Baker, to Heise's wife, and to the other women of his acquaintance.

== California Common beer ==
Apart from Anchor Steam, other commercial examples include Skyscraper Brewing Company Lug Nut Lager, Moab Brewery Rocket Bike Lager, Southampton West Coast Steam Beer, Old Dominion Victory Amber, Flying Dog Old Scratch Amber Lager, Schlafly's Pi Common, Linden Street Common Lager, Eagle Steam Beer, 33 Acres Brewing Company California Common, Cosmic Brewing Company Plead the Fifth, and Mare Island Brewing Company War Bond.

== Other varieties of "steam beer" ==
Adam Wood Steam Brewery is listed as having been sold in 1859.

When Canadian brewer Sleeman introduced a product called Steam Beer in Canada in 1999, Anchor sued for trademark infringement, since it had trademarked the term steam beer in Canada ten years earlier. Canadian courts dismissed the suit and subsequent appeals, ruling that Anchor's Canadian trademark was invalid, since the beer had not been marketed in Canada up to that time. After Sapporo bought Sleeman in a $400 million takeover in 2006, Sleeman's production of Steam Beer was discontinued.

The St. Louis Guide for Citizens and Strangers (1859) shows advertising copy for J. F. Boyd & Co. St. Louis Ale, Porter and Lager Beer Steam Brewery.

The 1865, New Orleans City Directory has an advertisement for the Old Canal Steam Brewery, "First Lager-Beer Steam Brewery in New Orleans", owned by Geo. Merz, next to the Ice House and Lager Beer Cellar.

Widmer Brothers Brewery released Columbia Common Beer, a seasonal common ale which is brewed with lager and hefeweizen yeasts and Columbia hops.

Derecho Common was issued by the Port City Brewing Company of Alexandria, VA after the power outages related to the June 2012 North American derecho resulted in a tank of Port City's beer fermenting as a steam beer due to loss of refrigeration. Port City has since continued to release Derecho Common.

Steam beer may have developed in parallel in North Korea. Due to the scarcity of electricity, a North Korean beer style very similar to steam beer has developed because it does not require refrigeration.

== See also ==
- Kentucky Common Beer
- Tower brewery
- Kölsch, a beer made in the opposite way of California Common
