= Magic Chef Mansion =

Historic house in St. Louis, Missouri

- U.S. National Register of Historic Places
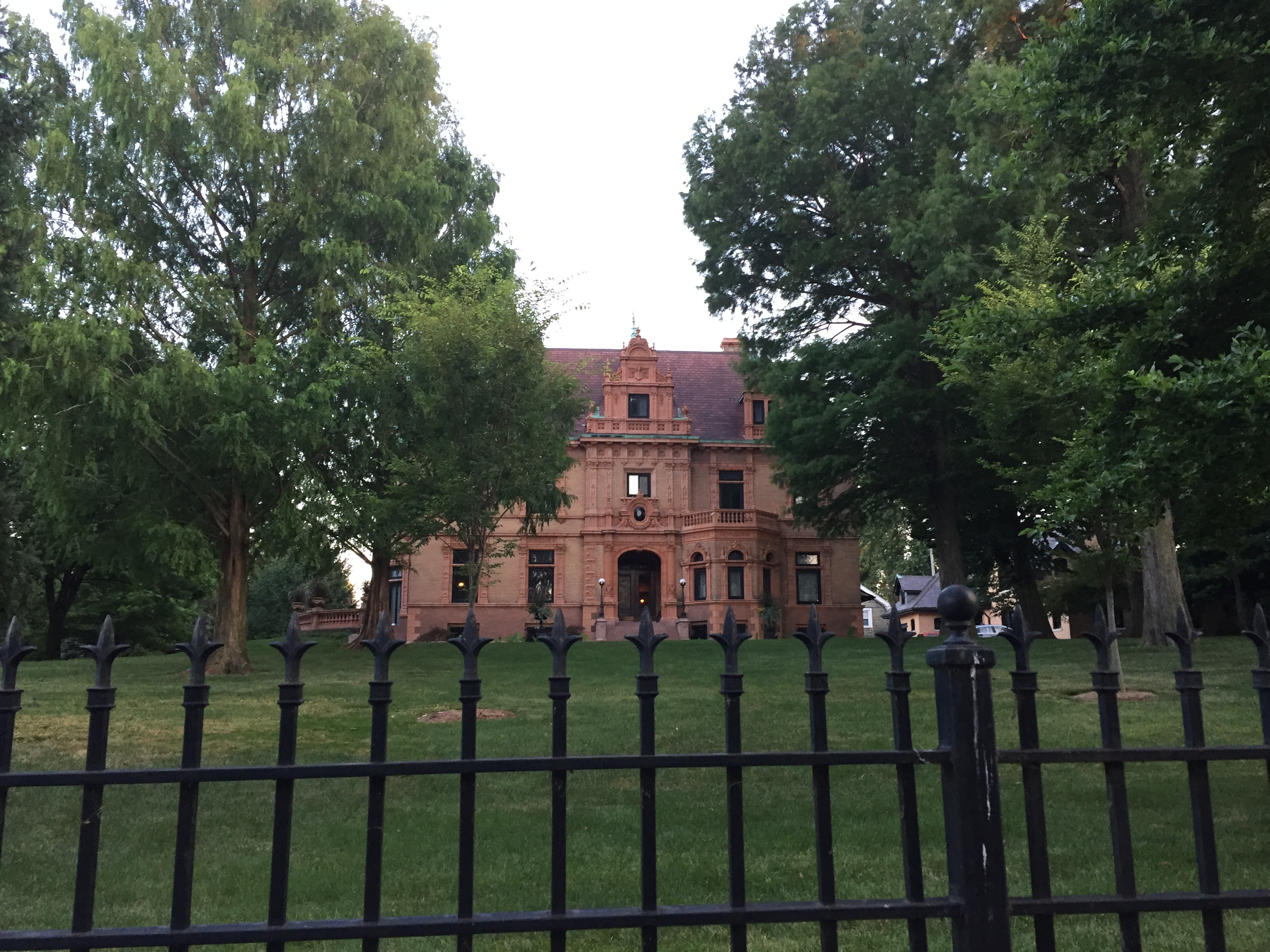
- The Magic Chef Mansion in 2017

- Location within Missouri
- Coordinates: 38°36′46.6″N 90°14′10.7″W
- Built: 1908
- Architect: Ernst Janssen
- Architectural style: French Renaissance Revival
- NRHP reference No.: 80004511
- Added to NRHP: November 9, 2018

The Magic Chef Mansion or the Charles Stockstrom House, located at 3400 Russell Boulevard, is a historic house in Compton Heights, St. Louis, Missouri, United States.

== History ==
The Magic Chef Mansion sits on a 2-acre (8,100 m^{2}) lot, with the house itself being 12,000 square feet (1,100 m^{2}). It was built in 1908 and designed by Ernst Janssen, in the French Renaissance Revival style. Its construction took one year and cost $49,500 ($1.8 million in 2025). It was built for Charles Stockstrom, president of Magic Chef, a kitchen appliance company, as well as father of interior designer Eleanor Brown. When finished, the house contained over 30 rooms, including a bowling alley and a library.

After a different daughter of Stockstrom died in 1990, the family sold the mansion to Shelley Donaho for $400,000 ($1.1 million in 2025), at an auction. She renovated it, which included fitting the kitchen with 1930s Magic Chef kitchenware, as well as adding a 1950s-style telephone booth and a plaque in memory of her father, Zane Barnes, who was CEO of Southwestern Bell until 1989. In 2006, Donaho made additional renovations using historic tax credits. As of 2016, she was mostly finished with renovations and rented the mansion for events. She planned to convert it to a museum.

The Magic Chef Mansion holds a urinal which has been studied by art scholars. English art scholar Glyn Thompson argues that Fountain by Marcel Duchamp was actually created by Elsa von Freytag-Loringhoven. According to Thompson, Duchamp falsely claimed in 1964 that the urinal featured in Fountain was manufactured by the Mott Company, when it was actually produced by the Trenton Potteries Company. On August 10, 2016, Thompson visited the house to examine a urinal in a first-floor bathroom that is the same make and model as Duchamp claimed, to measure it and note design differences between the two. Scholar Francis Naumann, who believes Duchamp did create Fountain, has also studied it.
