= Maytag Jackson plant =

- Built: 1991
- Operated: 1992–2009
- Location: Dr. F.E. Wright Drive; Jackson, Tennessee, United States
- Coordinates: 35°39′45″N 88°46′42″W
- Industry: Home appliances
- Products: dishwashers
- Employees: 500 (2008)
- Area: 33 acres (13 ha)
- Volume: 650,000 square feet (60,000 m^{2})
- Owner: Maytag Corporation

Maytag Jackson plant was an appliance manufacturing plant in Jackson, Tennessee owned by Maytag Corporation. The plant produced dishwashers. The facility was closed in 2009 by Whirlpool Corporation, which acquired Maytag in 2006.

== History ==
In 1991, Maytag built a new plant in Jackson, Tennessee, for the manufacture of newly designed plastic tub dishwashers. The Plastic tub was developed in Newton, Iowa, but in 1996 engineering was transferred to Jackson because Mr. Len Hadley, then president of Maytag Corporation, wanted the plant to be self-sufficient.

The Jackson plant evolved into a streamlined manufacturing facility that could build thousands of dishwashers daily on multiple lines, any SKU at any time. This plant was the most efficient plant and was a hallmark for other facilities, instead of adopting the plant as a touchstone for other plants. The plant was acquired by Whirlpool in 2006.

In late 2008, Whirlpool Corporation announced it would shut down the Jackson, Tennessee, Maytag dishwasher manufacturing plant by 2009, terminating 500 workers. The closure was part of a global restructuring plan to cut about 5,000 jobs and consolidate operations, with the Jackson plant's production shifting to Whirlpool's facility in Findlay, Ohio. In November 2008, just over a week after Whirlpool's announcement to close the Maytag plant in Jackson, Tennessee, a temporary 170-worker layoff hit the Findlay dishwasher plant.
