= Port City Brewing Company =

Craft brewery in Alexandria, Virginia

Coordinates: 38°48′28.8″N 77°6′5.3″W

Port City Brewing
- Type: Private
- Industry: Brewery
- Founded: 2011
- Founders: Bill and Karen Butcher
- Headquarters: Alexandria, VA, United States
- Website: Port City Brewing

Port City Brewing Company is a craft brewery located in Alexandria, Virginia. It is the first production brewery to operate in Alexandria since Prohibition, when the Robert Portner Brewing Company closed its doors. Port City was named the 2015 Small Brewing Company of the Year at the Great American Beer Festival.

== History ==
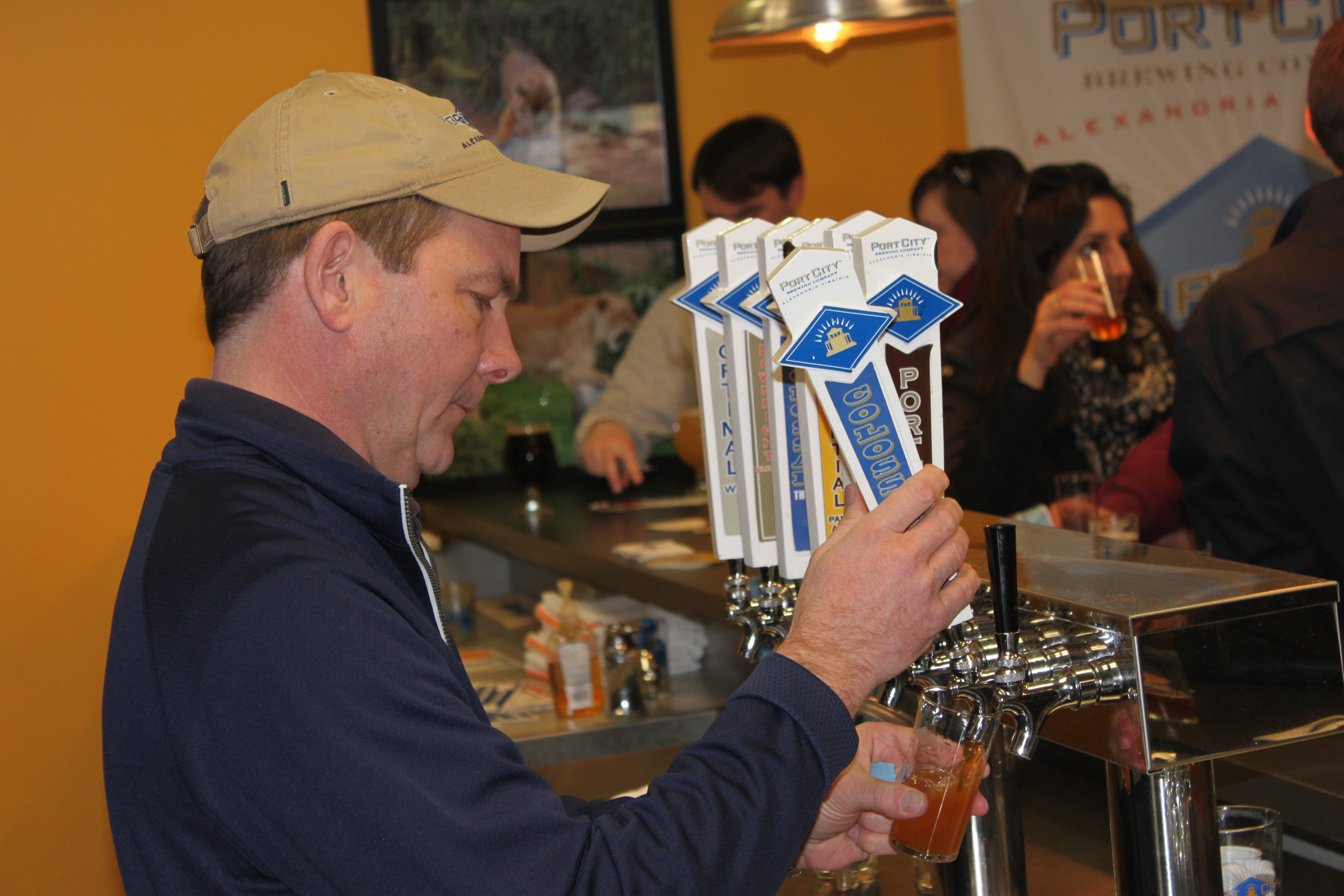
Bill Butcher pours beer at Port City Brewing Company's tasting room in 2014

Port City Brewing Company was founded by Bill and Karen Butcher, a former fine wine sales manager and intellectual property attorney respectively. The couple found that the Washington, D.C. area did not have enough high quality, locally produced craft beer and chose to open a brewery in Alexandria, where the Butcher family has been based for generations.

To spearhead brewing operations, the couple hired Jonathan Reeves, an accomplished brewer with over a decade of experience and numerous awards to his name, including several GABF medals. When the company opened its doors in February 2011, it was the first production inside the Beltway since the road’s construction in 1961.

Since its founding, Port City has garnered a number of awards, including 16 medals at the Great American Beer Festival, 12 Good Food Awards, and 32 medals at the Virginia Craft Brewers Festival.

On June 29, 2012, Port City lost power due to the June 2012 North American derecho. The power was out long enough that a Czech-style Pilsner finished primary fermentation at higher than normal temperatures and had the flavor profile of a steam beer (also called California Common); they were able to save four of five tanks after possibly having to lose 13,000 gallons of beer. Every year since then, they've produced Derecho Common as a summer seasonal.

In 2012, founder Bill Butcher was invited to address the Democratic National Convention in Charlotte, North Carolina on the subject of the Obama administration's relationship with the small business community. Butcher attracted the campaign's attention by appearing in a video promoting the American Recovery and Reinvestment Act of 2009, which helped get him a Small Business Administration-backed loan.
