= Maytag Newton plant =

Maytag manufacturing plant in Newton, Iowa, U.S.

- Operated: 1893–2007
- Location: 403 West 4th Street (North); Newton, Iowa, United States
- Coordinates: 41°42′10″N 93°3′33″W
- Industry: Home appliances
- Products: top-load washing machines; front-load washing machines; clothes dryers
- Employees: 1,800
- Area: 175 acres (71 ha)
- Volume: 1,900,000 square feet (180,000 m^{2})
- Owner: Maytag Corporation

Maytag Newton plant was an appliance manufacturing plant in Newton, Iowa, owned by Maytag Corporation. The plant produces washing machines and clothes dryers. The facility was closed in 2007 by Whirlpool Corporation, which acquired Maytag in 2006.

== History ==
In 1948, the plant was producing 2,000 wringer washers a day during post-World War II baby boom. To maintain the around 2,000-unit factory, local plant workers put in steady 60-hour workweeks. Also in that year, Maytag broke ground on its second laundry plant (Plant 2) in Newton, Iowa, which was opened in 1949 for the production of Maytag's first automatic washers, the "AMP", introduced that year.

In 1957, the facility launched the production of the Dependable Care line (referred to as the "Newton" platform) of washers (with the prefix "LAT"), which stayed production until Whirlpool closed the former Maytag plant in 2007.

In its 1970s peak, the 4,000-worker Maytag plant in Newton, Iowa was capable of producing 32,000 washing machines in just about 17 days. After producing 12 million units since 1909, Maytag ended the production of wringer washers at its main plant on November 22, 1983.

In 1997, the plant began producing the Neptune, the first domestically produced high-efficiency washer in the country, with a $999 retail price. Maytag announced in June 2004 that it was cutting 1,100 salaried jobs company-wide, including the plant, as part of a restructuring plan designed to lower operating costs. Also in the same year, 1,525 union workers represented by UAW Local 997 initiated a three-week strike at the flagship Maytag plant in Newton, Iowa.

On May 10, 2006, Whirlpool announced it will close the Maytag laundry manufacturing plant in Newton, Iowa by 2007, along with Maytag's corporate headquarters in the same area and their other laundry plants in Herrin, Illinois and Searcy, Arkansas, as part of a plan to eliminate 4,500 jobs following their merger with Maytag. The facility closed in October 2007, laying off approximately 1,800 workers in the 16,000-people town as manufacturing shifted to non-union facilities and Mexico.

In January 2007, prior to its closure, Whirlpool sold the former Maytag plant in Newton, Iowa to Industrial Realty Group (IRG), a Los Angeles-based real estate redevelopment firm, as part of a package deal; the company also sold the former Maytag headquarters in Newton Iowa to Iowa Telecommunications Services Inc. (Iowa Telecom) for $1.5 million.

== See also ==
- Maytag Herrin plant
- Maytag Searcy plant
