= Lewis Bergman Maytag =

American businessman (1888–1967)

Lewis Bergman Maytag I (August 24, 1888 – August 8, 1967) was a Maytag Corporation president. He was the son of the founder, Frederick Louis Maytag I, and he had a brother, Elmer Henry Maytag. Lewis graduated from Iowa State University in 1910 with a degree in Mechanical Engineering. He married and had as his son Lewis Bergman "Bud" Maytag Jr. (1926–1990) who left the family business to run Frontier Airlines and later National Airlines.

Sigma Alpha Epsilon and the "Maytag Mansion" at Iowa State University. In 1903, when Iowa State President Albert Boynton Storms lifted the ban on fraternities and sororities, twelve students formed a local fraternity known as the Dragon Society. Members met in homes around Ames until construction began on a chapter house at 2717 West Street, near the West Gate. In 1905, the Dragons Society petitioned the national fraternity Sigma Alpha Epsilon (SAE) for a charter. SAE was originally founded in 1856 at the University of Alabama by Noble Leslie DeVotie, and is the largest fraternity in the United States. The charter was approved and on June 5, 1905, the Dragon Society subsequently became the Iowa Gamma chapter of SAE.

In 1927, Brother Lewis B. Maytag, then the President of the Maytag Corporation in Newton, Iowa, offered a $6,000 challenge grant for Iowa Gamma to build a new chapter house. The alumni met Maytag's offer and, in the summer of 1928, construction began on a new house at 140 Lynn Avenue. Completed in the winter of 1929, at a total cost of nearly $45,000, many students started to refer to the stately new house as the "Maytag Mansion." The house originally housed twenty-eight men, a cook, and a housemother, but following the Second World War, when student enrollment skyrocketed, the house held nearly fifty men. Membership continued to grow throughout the 1950s and 1960s, and to accommodate the increase, an addition to the house was added in 1968. The house was completely renovated in 1997 following a capital campaign to raise $750,000.

Business positions
Preceded by Frederick Louis Maytag I	President of Maytag Corporation; 1921-1926	Succeeded by Elmer Henry Maytag
