= Fritz Maytag =

American businessman and brewer

Frederick Louis Maytag III
- Born: December 9, 1937 (age 88); Newton, Iowa, U.S.
- Occupations: Businessman, brewing magnate, viticulturist
- Employers: Anchor Brewing Company; Maytag Dairy Farms; York Creek Vineyards
- Parent: Frederick Louis Maytag II
- Relatives: Frederick Louis Maytag I, great-grandfather

Frederick Louis "Fritz" Maytag III (born December 9, 1937, in Newton, Iowa) is the former owner of Anchor Brewing Company in San Francisco and former chairman of the board of the Maytag Dairy Farms (maker of Maytag Blue cheese). He is also the owner of York Creek Vineyards in St. Helena, California. His revival of Anchor Steam beer inspired many other brewers to follow, and he is often considered the father of modern microbreweries. Maytag has also been an active trustee of Grinnell College, whose campus is close to the headquarters of Maytag Dairy Farms, recruiting among others Apple Computer's Steve Jobs to the Board of Trustees.

== Biography ==
Maytag is the great grandson of Maytag Corporation founder Frederick Louis Maytag I and son of Maytag Dairy Farms founder Frederick Louis Maytag II. He is a graduate of Deerfield Academy (1955) and attended Stanford University (1959).

In its April 2005 article "26 Most Fascinating Entrepreneurs", Inc. magazine named Maytag seventh-most fascinating "for setting limits".

Maytag won the 2008 James Beard Foundation's Lifetime Achievement award for his work at Anchor Brewing.

== Anchor Brewing Company ==
Hearing that the Anchor Brewing Company was about to close and looking for a business challenge outside his family's vast appliance concern, Maytag bought the company in 1965 and made enhancing its fortunes his mission. This venture did not initially meet with enthusiasm from his family back in Iowa. The Maytag family fortune grew dramatically over half a century as the family managed a vast international appliance manufacturing and distribution enterprise based in central Iowa. Its backbone was an extensive line of clothes-washing machines. The clothes washer is credited as one of several time-, labor-, and money-saving improvements to home life. It is one of the technologies defining what the rest of the world saw as the admired, relaxed, American lifestyle. In the 1920s, clothes washing was generally done by hand; the Maytag company was on the vanguard of automating this task. The company's highly recognized Lonely Maytag Repairman advertising promoted the brand and explained Maytag's higher price. Company advertising never veered from this central theme. The ad resonated and its message reinforced the brand's most noteworthy competitive advantage. The Lonely Maytag Repairman (created by Chicago Ad Agency Leo Burnett) is recognized as one of advertising's most successful, longest-running and most cost-effective ad campaigns of the last century.

With a commitment to quality and the use of more expensive raw materials being keys to the family's success in their Iowa washing machine business, Fritz Maytag was unafraid of Anchor Steam's low volume but higher-end market positioning. The brand had produced characterful local beer, but frequently in the 1950s and into the '60s it became contaminated, turning it sour. To revive the company, in his early years at Anchor, Maytag invested extensively, borrowing heavily to revamp the company and expand capacity. In so doing, he placed at risk a substantial portion of his inheritance, because to procure the loans required, he was required to post Maytag stock as collateral. However, at this time, the late 1960s, a bear market controlled the U.S. equity market. Maytag stock fell, and his lenders required Fritz to post more and more of his inheritance. Meanwhile, he focused on turning around Anchor Brewing's fortunes. He both altered the recipe and the complex brewing process. Over time the beer surged in popularity. The brewery, once located on the upper floors of a building in what is presently San Francisco's Design District, moved, in 1979, to a new location nearby at the base of Potrero Hill; and, throughout the years, demand continued to climb. Not wanting to sacrifice the small size of the brewery, and, in turn, the quality of the beer, Maytag helped competitors become proficient in microbrewing. This helped to ease the strain on his own company.

In 2010, Maytag sold the brewery.
