= New Albanian Brewing Company =

Coordinates: 38.328064°N 85.817107°W

- Brewing Ahead of the Curve
- Location: 3312 Plaza Dr, New Albany, Indiana
- Opened: 1987
- Annual production volume: 1,571 US beer barrels (1,844 hL)(2011)
- Owned by: Roger Baylor, Kate Lewison and Amy Baylor

Active beers
Name	Type
Beak's Best	American Bitter
Bob's Old 15-B	Porter
Community Dark	Mild ale
Elector	Imperial Red
Hoptimus	Imperial India Pale Ale
Tafelbier	Belgian Style Table Beer
Tunnel Vision	Belgian Rye Wit
Yakima	Rye India Pale Ale

Seasonal beers
Name	Type
Bonfire of the Valkyries	Schwarzbier
Oaktimus	Oak-Aged Imperial India Pale Ale

The New Albanian Brewing Company, located in the Metropolitan Louisville area in New Albany, Indiana, is a regional craft brewer with distribution throughout the states of Indiana and Kentucky. It has been rated as high as sixth among the world's craft breweries according to Ratebeer.com. It is the first commercial brewery to operate in New Albany since 1935.

New Albanian operates two breweries in New Albany, a production brewery in their downtown facility shared with their Bank Street Brewhouse taproom and gastropub and their original brewery, which now serves for research and development brewing and shares a suburban building with the company's New Albanian Pizzeria & Public House.

The business dates to 1987 as a family-owned pizzeria, then known as Sportstime Pizza, and became one of the Louisville area's most popular venues for craft and imported beers with the opening of its public house, originally Rich O's Public House, in 1992. Planning for the business' expansion into Craft Brewing began with its incorporation as the New Albanian Brewing Company in 1994 and brewing commenced in October 2002.

== Brewing ==
New Albanian began brewing in October 2002 in an annex to the company's suburban Pizzeria. The brewery was established by Roger Baylor, his former wife Amy (O'Connell) Baylor and her sister Kate (O'Connell) Lewison. The first brewmaster was Michael Borchers who brought experience and a 4-barrel brewing system from the former Silver Creek Brewing Corporation of Sellersburg, Indiana. Jesse Williams assumed brewing responsibilities when Borchers left in 2005 and was joined by Jared Williamson in 2008. Brewing is currently done by veteran Louisville Craft Brewer David R. Pierce, Director of Brewing Operations since 2009, at the Bank Street production brewery and Ben Minton at the R&D brewery.

NABC's original 4 barrel system produced 14,000 gallons of beer in 2005. With the addition of the 15 barrel DME production brewery on Bank Street in 2009 production has more than doubled, increasing to 1,571 US barrels in 2011 and permitting broader regional distribution. Bottling of select NABC beers in 22 oz. 'Bombers' began in March, 2011, with Elector, the NABC's Imperial Red Ale.

== Pizzeria & Public House ==
NABC Public House

While the brewery was officially founded in 2002, Rich O's (the public house) and Sportstime Pizza (the pizzeria) have operated prior to its inception. The establishment began in 1987 with Sportstime Pizza and it has slowly expanded since. The establishment was originally a Noble Roman's franchise operated by Rich and Sharon O'Connell, parents of Amy and Kate O'Connell and the namesake of Rich O's Public House. Rich O's opened in 1990 under Amy O'Connell's control. Roger Baylor was hired in 1992, and was soon to marry Amy. The marriage did not last, but the business relationship did. The businesses of Rich O's and Sportstime are co-owned by beer master Roger, and Kate and Amy, the daughters of Sharon and Rich O'Connell. For a brief period in the late 1980s a second location, "Sportstime II," was located on Vincennes Street in New Albany, across from New Albany High School.

Rich O's Public House offers 648 different beers to its customers in addition to its own beers. However, they refuse to serve light beer, deigning that as "unfit for human consumption." In addition to refusing to serve light beer, the company is strongly against mass-marketed domestic beer.

Sportstime Pizza has regular varieties of pizza, in addition to many specialties, such as the "refrigerator" style. They also offer alternative sauces for their pizza such as ranch, pesto, and barbecue. One of their other wildly popular products is their Beer Cheese.

The differences between Sportstime and Rich O's are mainly aesthetic, as the establishments share the same tiny kitchen and offer the same food and drink menus.

Located near Indiana University Southeast and across the river from the University of Louisville, the NABC is frequented by students and faculty of both schools.
