= Dixie-Narco =

American brand of soda vending machines

- Type: Subsidiary
- Industry: Vending machine manufacturing and distribution
- Fate: Consolidated into Crane Payment Innovations
- Headquarters: Williston, South Carolina, United States,
- Area served: Worldwide
- Products: Vending machines, parts
- Parent: Crane Payment Innovations
- Website: www.dixienarco.com

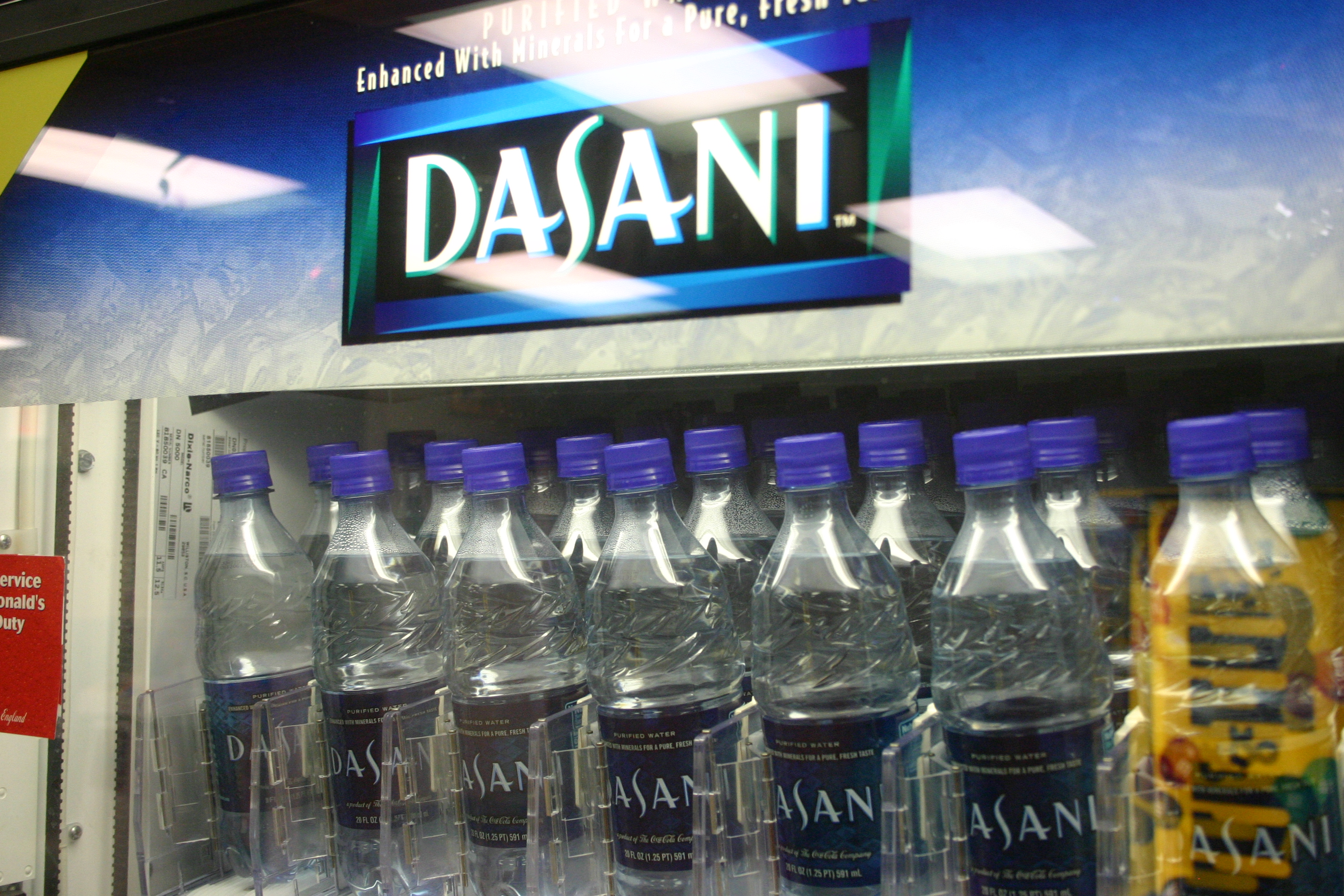
A Dixie-Narco DN5000 glass front elevator/conveyance vending machine. This specific model is exclusive to Coca-Cola bottlers.

Dixie-Narco was a former brand of soda vending machines located in Williston, South Carolina owned by Crane Payment Innovations.

== History and description ==
Founded in Ranson, West Virginia, the company's production facilities were relocated to Williston in 1989. Formerly a subsidiary of Maytag, it is now a subsidiary of Crane Payment Innovations, who also owns the Crane National, Glasco Polyvend Lektrovend (GPL), and Automatic Products (APi) brands.

The company was an early adopter of employee-suggestion-driven cost savings, soliciting suggestions based on the Rucker "share of production" plan in the early 1960s that helped drive down manufacturing costs.

In 2017, the Dixie-Narco, along with the National, GPL, and Automatic Products brands were retired in favor of the single Crane Merchandising Systems brand. The former Dixie-Narco glass front products are still produced today under the CMS brand.

== Legal dispute with Donald Trump ==
In 1991, Dixie-Narco was involved in a legal dispute with Donald Trump before a Federal Bankruptcy Court related to Trump's Taj Mahal Casino. Dixie-Narco claimed that they were owed payment by Trump for 1,350 bill-changing machines they had supplied the casino with, and that the bond-holder approval necessary for Trump's Chapter 11 filing had been improperly solicited as Trump had told them that Dixie-Narco's claim for $6 million of the machines was "worthless". Trump also asserted that the machines had often broken down. The claim was settled with an offer of $2.4 million to be paid in increasing installments to Dixie-Narco, as well as the Taj Mahal returning 500 of the machines, in return for which Dixie-Narco withdrew their objection to Trump's Chapter 11 debt restructuring.

== Current products ==
=== Glass front vending machines ===
- DN 3800 (small capacity)/DN 5800 (large capacity) - glass front vendor featuring a robotic moving cup that grabs and delivers product to buyer. The product was initially introduced in 2006 as the Bevmax 2EP. The design was updated in 2008 as the Bevmax 3, where the delivery cup height was raised and speeds were increased. In 2009, a further updated version known as the Bevmax 4 was introduced. The Bevmax 4 features even faster vend speeds and is more energy-efficient, optionally using LED lighting rather than fluorescent and meeting Tier 2 (later updated to Tier 3) Energy Star standards. In 2012, an updated version of the Bevmax 4 (known as the Bevmax Media) was introduced, replacing the keypad and vacuum fluorescent display with a color touchscreen LCD, as well as introducing a new integrated payment system with support for credit/debit cards, large bills, coins, and mobile wallet payment. The Bevmax 4 is available unbranded or through select Coca-Cola, Pepsi, and Keurig Dr. Pepper bottlers.

== Discontinued products ==
=== Conventional (stack) vending machines ===
Dixie Narco named their stack vendors by how many cans it would hold and a suffix denoting the series (no suffix meant an earlier single price machine), for example a 501E is an E-series vendor that had a capacity of 501 cans.

- DNCB series - current generation ADA compliant conventional multiprice stack vendor, available in either small (448-7) or large (640-10) capacities.
- P-series - conventional multiprice stack vendor introduced in the mid 2000s and produced until 2013 (when the new ADA standards for vending machines went into effect), available in either small (504P) or large (720P) capacities.
- E-series - conventional multiprice stack vendor produced from the mid 1990s to the late 2000s, available in small (276E), medium (501E) or large (600E) capacities. Named for extended cabinet, because it was enlarged to fit 20oz. sodas 2 deep
- ER/R-Series- conventional single price stack vendors, with many shared parts with the E-series, mainly produced for Tropicana and Veryfine Juices.
- T-series - conventional single price stack vendor, smaller port that was mainly for cans.
- single price -conventional single price stack vendor, earlier models had a flat front and a protruding port, later models had rounded bubble fronts.

=== Glass front vending machines ===
- DN 3500 (small capacity)/DN 5500 (large capacity) Beveragemax - previous generation free-fall glass front vendor introduced in the late 1990s.
- DN 3000 (small capacity)/DN 5000 (large capacity) - elevator/conveyance glass front vendor, introduced in the early 2000s and designed exclusively for select Coca-Cola bottlers. No longer available as of 2009; replaced by the Bevmax 4.
- DN 3591, 5591, 2145, 2045 - bottle drop glass front vendors, with the DN 3591 named the "Babybev" and the 5591 named the "Bevmax1"
- DN 3/5800-2, -3 Bevmax 2 and 3, with a robot picker being introduced in the 2, and, after being refined, became the Bevmax 3, which got refined once again to become the current Bevmax 4.
