= Elmer Henry Maytag =

Elmer Henry Maytag (September 18, 1883 – 20 July 1940) was the Maytag Corporation president starting in 1926. He also founded the Maytag Dairy Farms.

== Biography ==
He was born on September 18, 1883, to Frederick Louis Maytag I and had as a brother Lewis Bergman Maytag. He married Ora Kennedy and had as his children: Frederick Louis Maytag II, Mary Louise Maytag (1916-?), Robert E. Maytag (1923–1962), and Elizabeth J. Maytag (1925-?)

Elmer died in 1940 in Lake Geneva, Wisconsin.

Business positions
| Preceded by Frederick Louis Maytag I | President of Maytag Corporation; 1926-1940 | Succeeded by Frederick Louis Maytag II |
