= Crane Payment Innovations =

Designer and manufacturer of vending machines

- Formerly: Crane Merchandising Systems
- Type: Subsidiary
- Industry: Automated vending
- Founded: 1926; 100 years ago
- Founder: B. E. Fry
- Products: Vending machines
- Parent: Crane NXT
- Website: cranepi.com

Crane Payment Innovations (formerly Crane Merchandising Systems) is a designer and manufacturer of vending machines. They are a business unit of publicly traded Crane NXT and their manufacturing facility is located in Williston, South Carolina, United States.

== History ==
Logo as Crane Merchandising

=== Establishment ===
Crane Merchandising Systems was founded in 1926 by B. E. Fry, a St. Louis businessman, as the "National Sales Machine Company." Fry invented a more foolproof vending machine that would only accept coins, unlike older machines, such as the "Smoketeria", a cigarette vending machine, which would accept things such as flat buttons and cardboard discs.

=== The Great Depression ===
By 1931, National Sales Machine Company was a well established business, manufacturing a variety of merchandisers for various food products. However, The Great Depression proved too much for the company, and it went under in 1932. Soon thereafter, in the spring of 1933, Fry's son, B. W. Fry, reopened the company as National Vendors, Inc. In 1934, Al Diederich joined B. W. Fry in National Vendors, giving it the administrative strength it would need to grow during the tumultuous 30s and 40s.

=== World War II - 1960s ===
During World War II, National Vendors took part in the war effort by producing mortar ammunitions casings. After the war, the company returned to the demand for convenient cigarette, candy and pastry vendors. In 1956, National Vendors was acquired by the Universal Match Company, allowing National Vendors to introduce several new products. In 1967, National Vendors introduced its first full line of automatic merchandising equipment. CMS was acquired by Crane Corporation in 1985, and became Crane National Vendors.

=== Present Day ===
Today, Crane Merchandising Systems designs and manufactures a diverse, yet integrated portfolio of automatic merchandising equipment across multiple verticals, including hot and cold beverage, snack, and food. It also offers other vending solutions including Media touch screens, cashless processing, payment devices, vending management software, and wireless communication technology. The company is a segment of Crane NXT (NYSE:CXT). Brad Tedder is the company's president.

In 2017, CMS retired its legacy National, Dixie-Narco, GPL, and Automatic Products brands in favor of the single Crane Merchandising Systems brand for all its products.
