= Frederick Louis Maytag I =

American founder of the Maytag washing machine manufacturer (1857–1937)

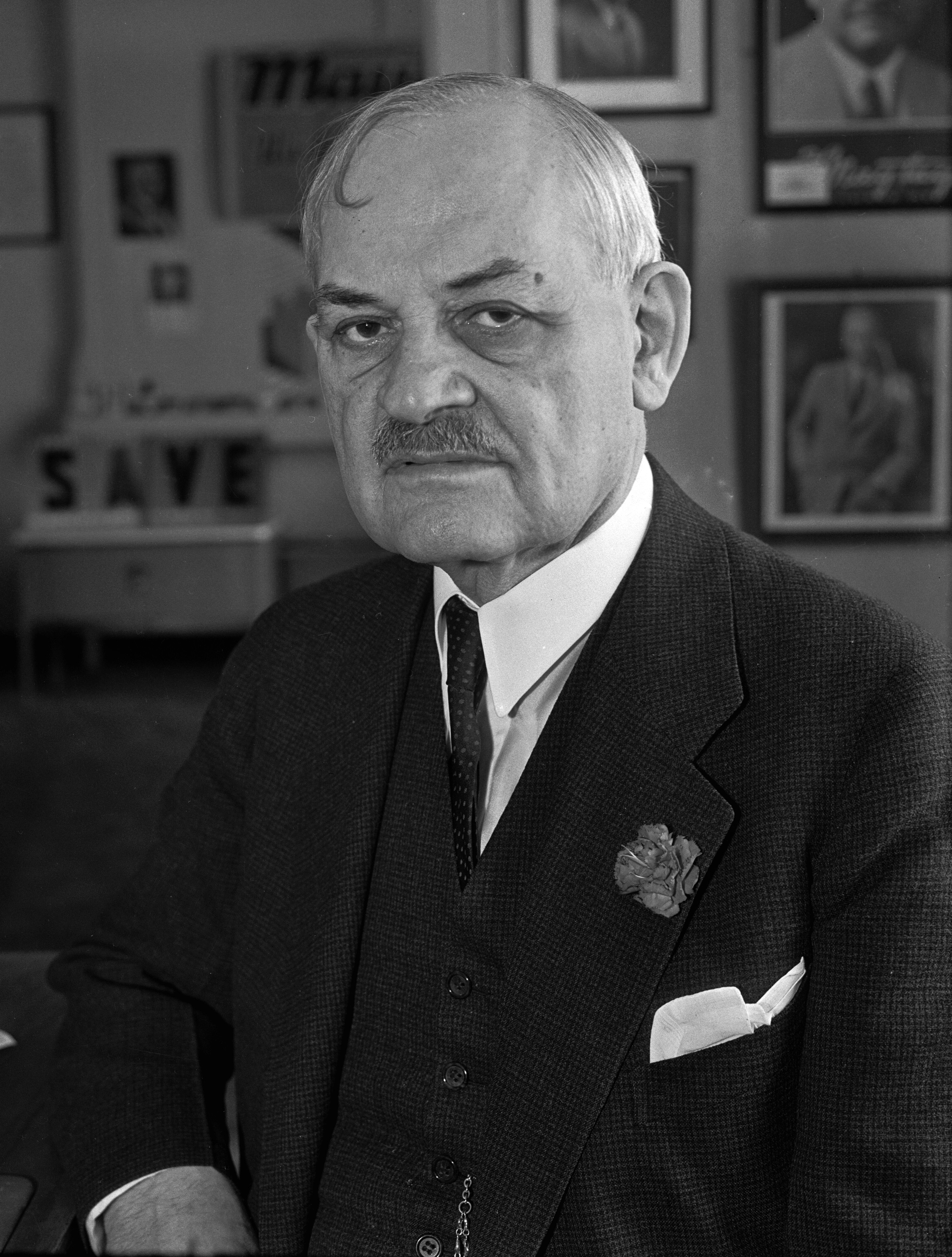
Maytag in 1935

Frederick Louis Maytag I (July 14, 1857 – March 26, 1937) also known as F. L. Maytag, founded the Maytag Company, which eventually became the Maytag Corporation and in turn was acquired by the Whirlpool Corporation in 2006.

== Birth ==
Maytag was born July 14, 1857, in Elgin, Illinois, the eldest of 10 children born to German immigrants Amelia Tonebon (1837-1905) and Daniel William Maytag (1833–1900), who had Anglicized the original spelling of his surname from Maitag upon arrival. The full set of children were: Frederick Louis Maytag I (1857–1937); Lewis R. Maytag (1859–1943); Martha M. Maytag (1861-1955); Theodore Henry Maytag (1864–1931); Jacob E. Maytag (1866-1908); Emma Maytag (1869–1956); Daniel C. Maytag (1872–1956); Helena Maytag (1875–1881); Anna A. Maytag (1877–1964); and Viola Maytag (1880–1966). In 1867, when Frederick was ten years old, the family traveled in a covered wagon to a small farm near Laurel, Iowa.

== Education ==
Maytag attended North Central College in Naperville, Illinois, in 1872-73.

== Business ==
In 1893, Maytag, his two brothers-in-law, and George W. Parsons each contributed US$600, for a total of $2,400, to start a new farm implement company named Parsons Band-Cutter & Self Feeder Company. This company produced threshing machines, band-cutters, and self-feeder attachments invented by Parsons.

Maytag eventually took sole control of the firm and renamed it the Maytag Company. As the company grew, he forayed into other businesses such as the Maytag-Mason Motor Company automobiles. In the 1910s, he left the day-to-day company operation in the hands of sons Elmer and Lewis, to concentrate on other business areas including innovations of a washing machine with a gas powered motor branded as the Multi-Motor and a washing machine with an agitator that forced the water through the clothes branded as the Gyrafoam. These inventions proved extremely valuable as by 1927, the Maytag Company was producing more than twice the washers of its nearest competition and had outperformed the industry with growth doubling for five consecutive years.

Even after Elmer became the company's president in 1926, Maytag was active in promoting its products, and ensuring worker happiness and often greeted employees by asking, "Is everybody happy?"

Maytag was inducted into the Junior Achievement U.S. Business Hall of Fame in 1995.

An active member in his Masonic Lodge, he was a member of Newton Lodge No. 59, Newton, Iowa, receiving degrees on April 23, May 14, and raised a Master Mason on Sept. 13, 1887.

== Marriage ==
Maytag married Dena Bergman, and they had two sons and two daughters. He donated a 40-acre (160,000 m^{2}) park and swimming pool to the city of Newton, Iowa, now named Maytag Park and Maytag Pool. He built and donated the Maytag Hotel and spearheaded a theater and a water plant. Maytag also built hundreds of houses for his workers, selling them on easy terms.

== Politics ==
Maytag served as a Republican state senator in Iowa from 1902 to 1909.

== Death ==
In 1937, Frederick Maytag died of a heart ailment at Good Samaritan Hospital, near his winter home in Beverly Hills, California. He left a $10 million estate (equivalent to $229 million today).

A special train brought mourners from the east coast to Newton, Iowa, and an estimated 10,000 factory workers and salesmen formed a line five blocks long to observe the casket processional. Those who could not fit into the First Methodist Church for the funeral service were taken to four other churches and two halls.

He is buried in Newton Union Cemetery, Newton, Jasper County, Iowa.

== See also ==
- F. L. Maytag II
- F. L. Maytag III

Business positions
Preceded by None	First President of Maytag Corporation; 1893–1921	Succeeded by Lewis Bergman Maytag
