= Magic Chef =

American kitchen appliance brand

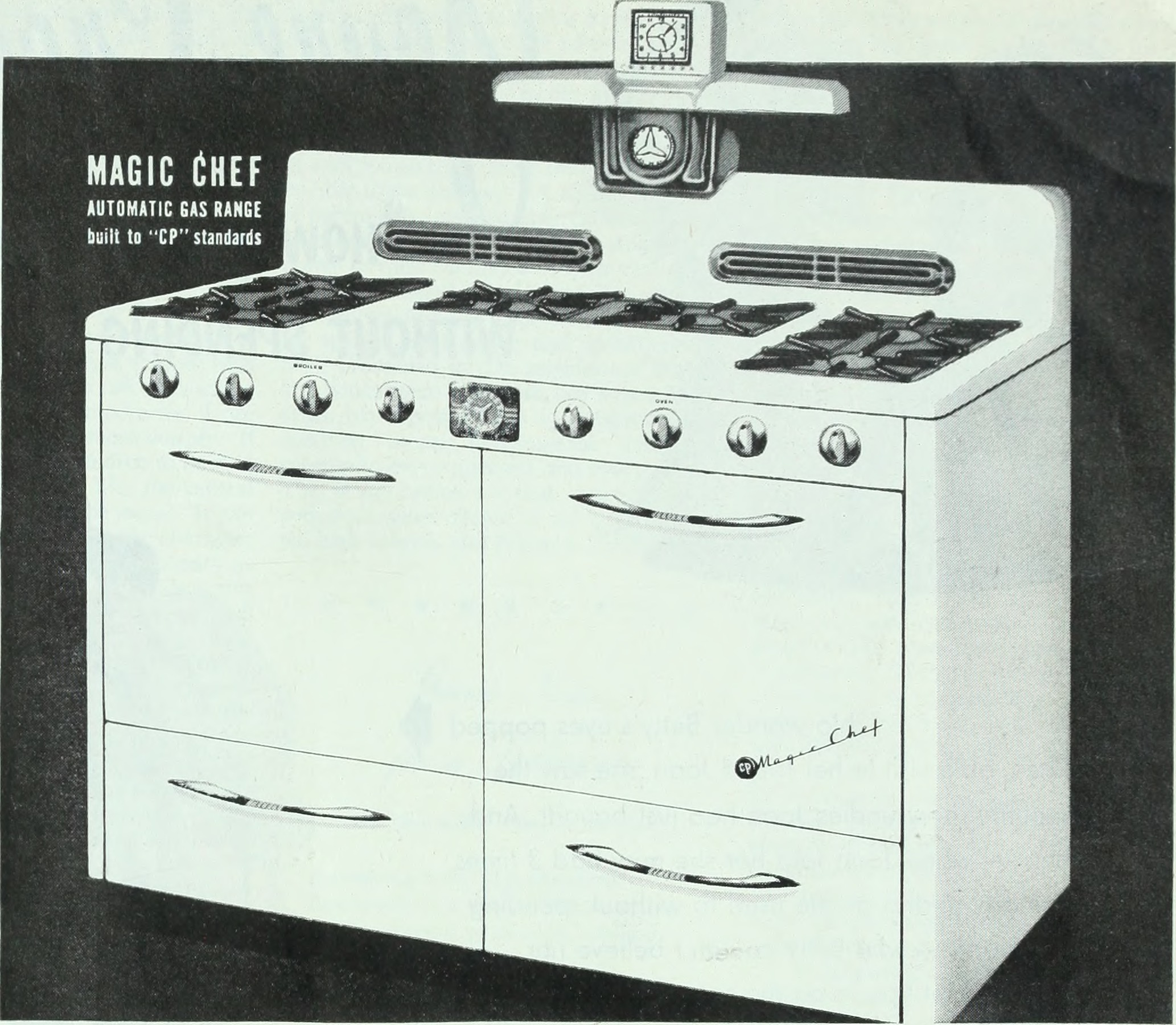
Ad for a Magic Chef gas range (1948)

Magic Chef, Inc. (formerly the American Stove Company) is an appliance brand currently owned by CNA International Inc.

== St. Louis origins ==
In the 1850s John Ringen, a German immigrant to the United States, began a tinshop in St. Louis, Missouri. His business prospered and, in 1870, he took in a partner, George August Kahle, who had immigrated to America from Germany in 1867. The business sold housewares, early washing machines, and cooking stoves they called "quick meals".

In 1881, George Kahle persuaded his brothers-in-law, Charles and Louis Stockstrom, to set up a shop to manufacture stoves. These four principals then organized two corporations, the Quick Meal Stove Company and the Ringen Stove Company.

== American Stove Company and the Magic Chef brand name ==
Quick Meal manufactured the stoves, with Ringen Stove handling sales and distribution of the entire output of Quick Meal's production. The phenomenal growth of these two companies during the 1880s and 1890s led to the merger of eight other stove companies in St. Louis, Chicago and Cleveland in 1901 to form the American Stove Company. American Stove introduced the first oven temperature control device in 1914.

In 1929, it began using the brand name Magic Chef. The Magic Chef name was so successful as an oven and stove brand that American Stove Company changed its name to Magic Chef, Inc. in 1951. The company remained well known for its gas stoves, but attempts to spread the brand to other household appliances were unsuccessful.

== Sales and spread ==
In 1957, it was merged with the Food Giant Markets of California. In 1958, it was sold to Dixie Products, a small stove company of Cleveland, Tennessee, after selling off a few underperforming divisions of Magic Chef.

In 1974, Magic Chef bought the Norge Village Laundry & Dry Cleaners chain.

By 1986, the company had become the 249th largest industrial company in the nation, and was sold to Maytag for $740 million. Magic Chef also made home furnaces and air conditioners; that operation was sold to Lennox International in 1988.

Whirlpool Corporation acquired Maytag Corporation in 2006. Magic Chef has been spun out to CNA International Inc./MC Appliance Corporation, which imports and markets small appliances under several brand names.

== See also ==
- Dortch Stove Works: A historic Magic Chef factory in Franklin, Tennessee
- Magic Chef Mansion
