= Frederick Louis Maytag II =

Frederick Louis Maytag II (January 8, 1911 – November 4, 1962) was President and, later, Chairman of the Maytag company. In the early 1940s, he and Robert E. Maytag (born 1923), both sons of Elmer Henry Maytag, created a cheese plant and storage caves on Maytag Dairy Farms to take advantage of a process developed by Iowa State University researchers to make blue cheese using homogenized milk. He was married and had a son named Frederick Louis Maytag III.

Business positions
| Preceded by Elmer Henry Maytag | President of Maytag Corporation; 1940-1962 | Succeeded by E.G. Higdon |
