= Maytag =

American home and commercial appliance brand

Maytag Corporation

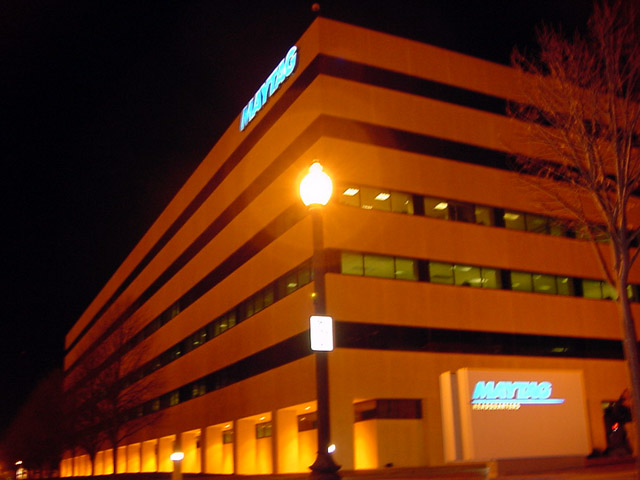
- Former headquarters of the Maytag Corporation, Newton, Iowa
- Type: Subsidiary
- Founded: 1893; 133 years ago (as Maytag Washing Machine Company); Newton, Iowa, U.S.
- Defunct: 2006 (as a company)
- Fate: Acquired by Whirlpool Corporation in 2006
- Products: Appliances
- Revenue: ▲US$4.7 billion
- Number of employees: 2,500
- Parent: Whirlpool Corporation (2006–present)
- Subsidiaries: See § Owned brands
- Website: www.maytag.com

The Maytag Corporation is an American home and commercial appliance company. The company has been owned by Whirlpool Corporation since April 2006.

== History ==
Former Maytag logo, created by design firm Chapman, Goldsmith & Yamasaki in 1963, and used until 2008

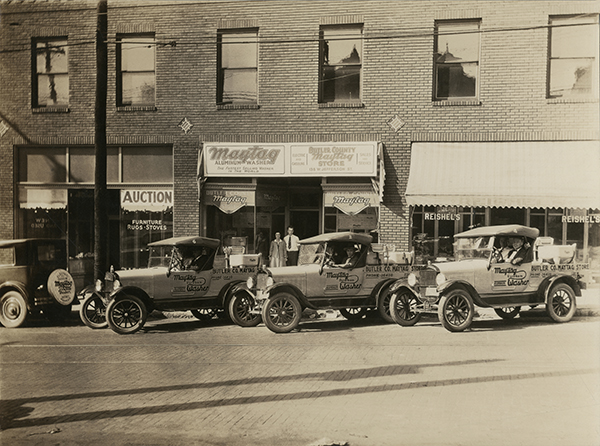
Edna & Floyd Cramer at their Maytag Store in Butler, Pennsylvania 1920s

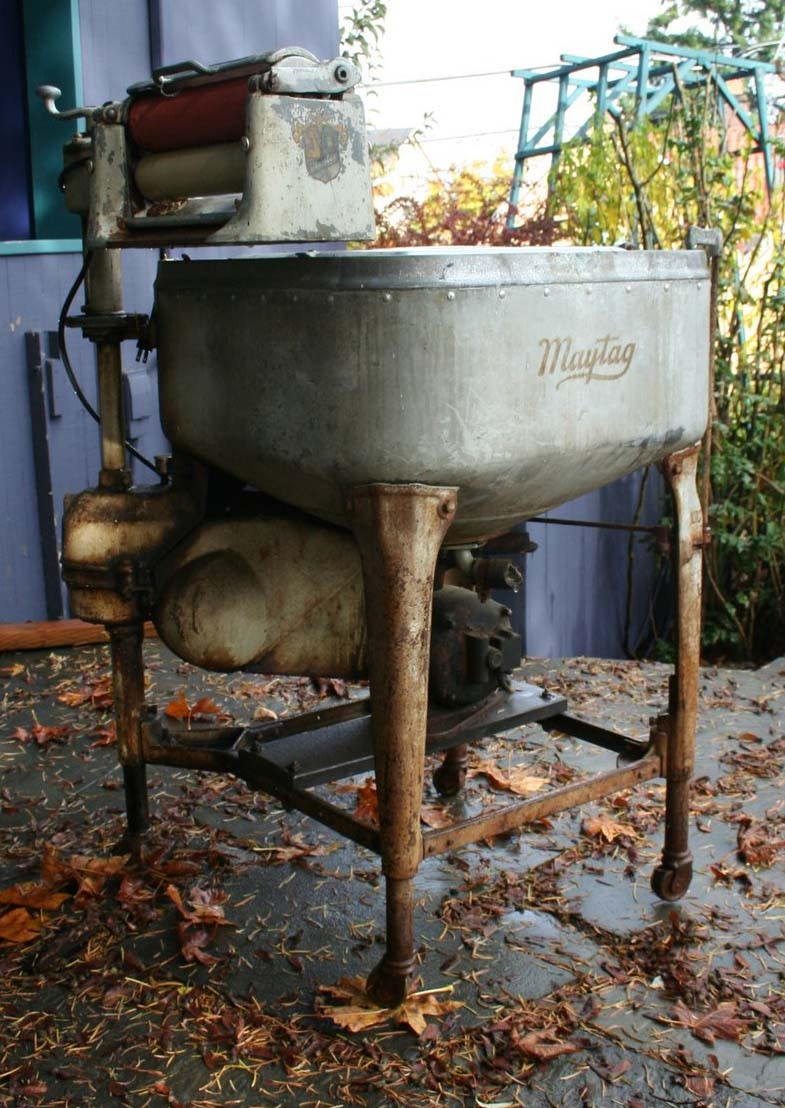
Antique Maytag washing machine.

1928 Maytag Model 90 Wringer Washer completely restored

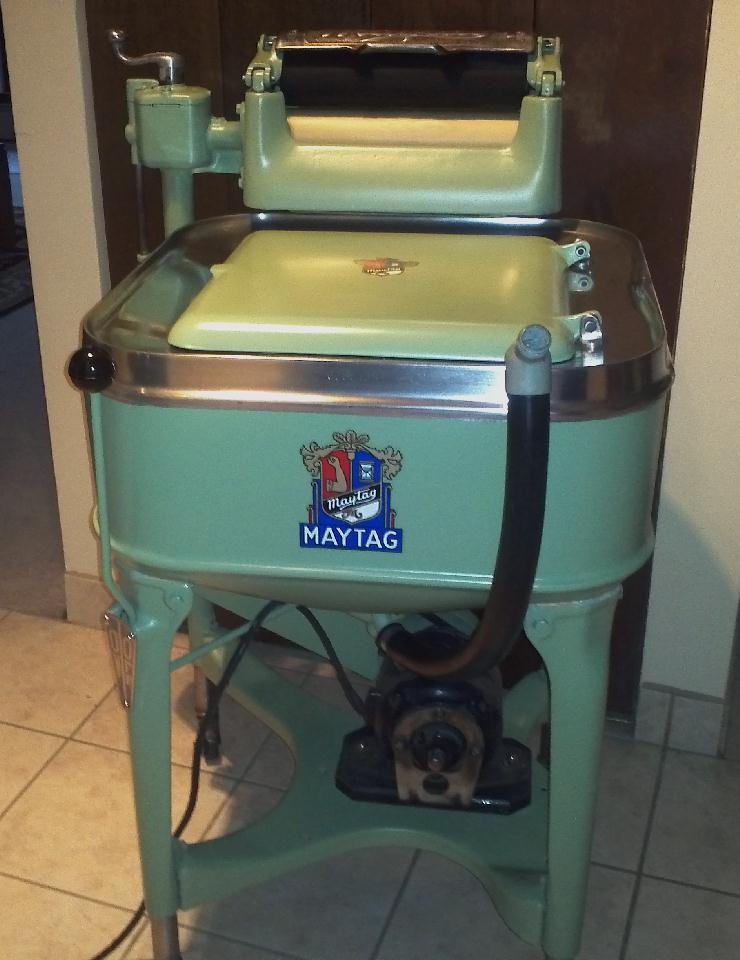
1935 Maytag Model 30 Wringer Washer

=== Early years and expansion ===
The Maytag Washing Machine Company was founded in 1893 when businessman Frederick Maytag, his two brothers-in-law, and George W. Parsons each contributed $600 for a total of $2,400 to start a new farm implement company named Parsons Band-Cutter & Self Feeder Company. They produced threshing machines, band-cutters, and self-feeder attachments invented by Parsons. Threshing machine-related injuries were all too common, and a strong need for a safer threshing machine was present. The company successfully met this need by developing a threshing machine feeder, a device which fed straw more safely into the threshing cylinder.

In 1925, Maytag Washing Machine Company became Maytag, Inc. Frederick's son Elmer Henry Maytag took over as president of the company from 1926 until his own death in 1940. In the early 1930s, photographer Theodor Horydczak took pictures of the plant and some of its workers. During the Great Depression of the 1930s, the company was one of the few to make a profit. In 1938, Maytag provoked strikes by the company's workers because of a 10% pay cut. The company was able to beat the strike because of the intervention of four military companies, including a machine gun company, of the 113th Cavalry Regiment, Iowa National Guard. At his father's death in 1940, Fred Maytag II, grandson of the founder, took over the presidency. During World War II, the company participated in war production by making special components for military equipment. In 1946, production of washing machines was resumed; in 1949, the first automatic washers were produced in a new, dedicated factory. In 1946, Maytag began marketing a separate line of ranges and refrigerators made by other companies under the Maytag name. During the Korean War, the company again produced parts for military equipment, although washing-machine production continued.

During the 1950s, the 'white goods,' or laundry and kitchen appliance industry, grew rapidly. Maytag first entered the commercial laundry field at this time, manufacturing washers and dryers for commercial self-service laundries and commercial operators. In response, other full-line appliance producers began to compete with Maytag in the white-goods consumer market. These included 'full-line' manufacturers such as Whirlpool, General Electric, Westinghouse, and Frigidaire, who built not only washing machines and dryers, but also refrigerators, stoves, and other appliances. Since Maytag was much smaller than the full-line producers, the company decided to limit itself to the manufacture of washers and dryers, alongside marketing ovens and refrigerators built by other companies, as a small, premium-brand manufacturer. The company capitalized on its reputation by renaming its corporate address in Newton, Iowa, "One Dependability Square".

By 1960, Maytag had ceased marketing ovens and refrigerators, but later started again to expand into kitchen appliances with its own design of portable kitchen dishwasher and a line of food-waste disposers. Upon the death in 1962 of Fred Maytag II, the last family member involved in the company's management, E. G. Higdon was named president of the company, with George M. Umbreit becoming chairman and CEO. By the late 1970s, over 70 percent of U.S. households were equipped with washers and dryers, and with approximately 18,000 employees worldwide, the company was established as a dominant manufacturer of large laundry appliances.

In 1981, Maytag acquired the Hardwick Stove Company. After producing 12 million units since 1909, Maytag discontinued production of wringer washers on November 22, 1983. After the company's acquisition of Magic Chef, Inc. (including the Norge Appliance Company) for $740 million in 1986, a move which nearly doubled its size, the company acquired a new corporate name, Maytag Corporation, and started selling a full line of appliances.

In 1988, Maytag acquired Chicago Pacific Corporation, which was formed using the remnants of the bankrupt Chicago, Rock Island & Pacific Railroad. Chicago Pacific Corporation owned Hoover US and Hoover UK as well as Thomasville Brand Furniture. Maytag quickly sold off the Thomasville Furniture brand. Maytag Corporation, led by Chairman Daniel Krumm, next planned to make Maytag a worldwide organization. The UK part of Hoover was to help Maytag expand into Europe. Hoover UK was not doing well financially and offered customers a round-trip ticket anywhere if they purchased a vacuum. This campaign cost the corporation $50 million to settle. Subsequently, Maytag sold off Hoover UK. This was a huge setback for the amount of cash Maytag had in hand and thus started the downward spiral financially.

In 1991, Maytag built a new manufacturing plant in Jackson, Tennessee (which was opened in 1992) for the manufacture of newly designed plastic tub dishwashers. The plastic tub was developed in Newton, Iowa, but in 1996 engineering was transferred to Jackson because Mr. Len Hadley, then president of Maytag Corporation, wanted the plant to be self-sufficient. Whirlpool closed this plant in 2009.

In 1997, Maytag Corporation purchased G.S. Blodgett Corporation, a maker of commercial ovens. At the time of this purchase Maytag was looking at the Turbo Chef line they had been working on up to this point.

=== Decline ===
Prior to 1997, the Maytag engineering team, at Maytag Laundry Appliances Research and Development, developed the Maytag Neptune line of front-load washers. A matching dryer was introduced to accompany the new washer. The company claimed that the new Neptune model saved energy costs over traditional washer/dryer sets. Production of the Neptune line was later switched to Samsung Electronics. In 2001, the company acquired the Amana Corporation and its appliance assembly facilities. That same year, Ralph F. Hake became the last chairman and chief executive officer (CEO) of Maytag Corporation, serving in that post until March 2006. Once renowned as the standard for laundry appliances, by 2003 the company faced increasing competition from new appliance brands (such as LG and Haier) in the US market, as well as from existing appliance manufacturers (such as GE), who had outsourced production to Mabe a decade earlier in order to reduce costs. While Maytag had begun the process of shifting appliance production to lower-cost assembly plants outside the United States, in 2004, the company was still producing 88 percent of its products in older U.S.-based factories. In an apparent move away from traditional company marketing strategy, company management decided on a plan to stimulate consumer purchases of new Maytag appliances before their old ones had worn out.

Costs incurred in Maytag's acquisition and integration of Amana and an increased corporate debt load led to aggressive internal cost-cutting efforts in direct materials, manufacturing, and distribution costs. Maytag introduced a value-priced appliance line under a separate label, Performa by Maytag. To increase sales, the company also marketed Maytag-branded 'Legacy Series' washing machines that were otherwise identical to low-end Amana models, and built at the formerly Amana assembly plant in Searcy, Arkansas. The rebranded Maytag models, later termed Amanatags by dissatisfied owners, received poor customer reviews after reports surfaced of major mechanical and/or durability problems. The company also consolidated warehouse operations and cut the number of Maytag vendors. Between 2002 and 2004, Maytag corporate management cut new-product investment by 50%. This lack of foresight and the position to focus on share value pigeon holed the Corporation into a cycle of hiring/firing project start and stagnate future design and innovation.

An increasing chorus of consumer complaints concerning product reliability and customer service, assisted by the rapid growth of internet consumer forums, began to affect the company's reputation with customers. The company was also slow to react to customer complaints regarding its flagship Neptune washer and dryer line (labeled the Stinkomatic by dissatisfied customers because they would become moldy in a way that could not be easily cleaned), resulting in further damage to the company's reputation and a $33.5 million payout to settle several class-action lawsuits arising from the Neptune problems. By 2005, Maytag's market share had declined to all-time lows, sales were flat, and customer satisfaction surveys ranked Maytag near the bottom of the appliance field. The problems with the Neptune line continued; in 2007, 250,000 Neptune washing machines became part of a nationwide safety recall by the Consumer Product Safety Commission due to fire danger.

In 2005, Haier sought to expand its share of foreign markets by acquiring rival white-goods OEMs and by expanding overseas production capacity. With backing from two large U.S. private equity funds, Haier made a bid to acquire U.S. appliance maker Maytag for $1.28 billion. The bid failed and Maytag was bought by Whirlpool for $1.7 billion.

=== Acquisition by Whirlpool Corporation ===
On April 1, 2006, Whirlpool completed its acquisition of Maytag Corporation. On May 10, 2006, Whirlpool announced plans to close all three Maytag laundry manufacturing plants in Newton, Iowa, Herrin, Illinois, and Searcy, Arkansas, as well as the former Maytag headquarters office in Newton by 2007. Following the Maytag headquarters closure, all brand administration was transferred to Whirlpool's headquarters in Benton Harbor, Michigan. The Maytag name would now be used on Whirlpool-designed appliances. Most Maytag employees were terminated, but some were offered jobs at Whirlpool. The board of directors of Maytag all received five years' severance pay. Former Maytag chairman and CEO, Ralph F. Hake, received two years' base salary and two years' target bonus under his severance agreement.

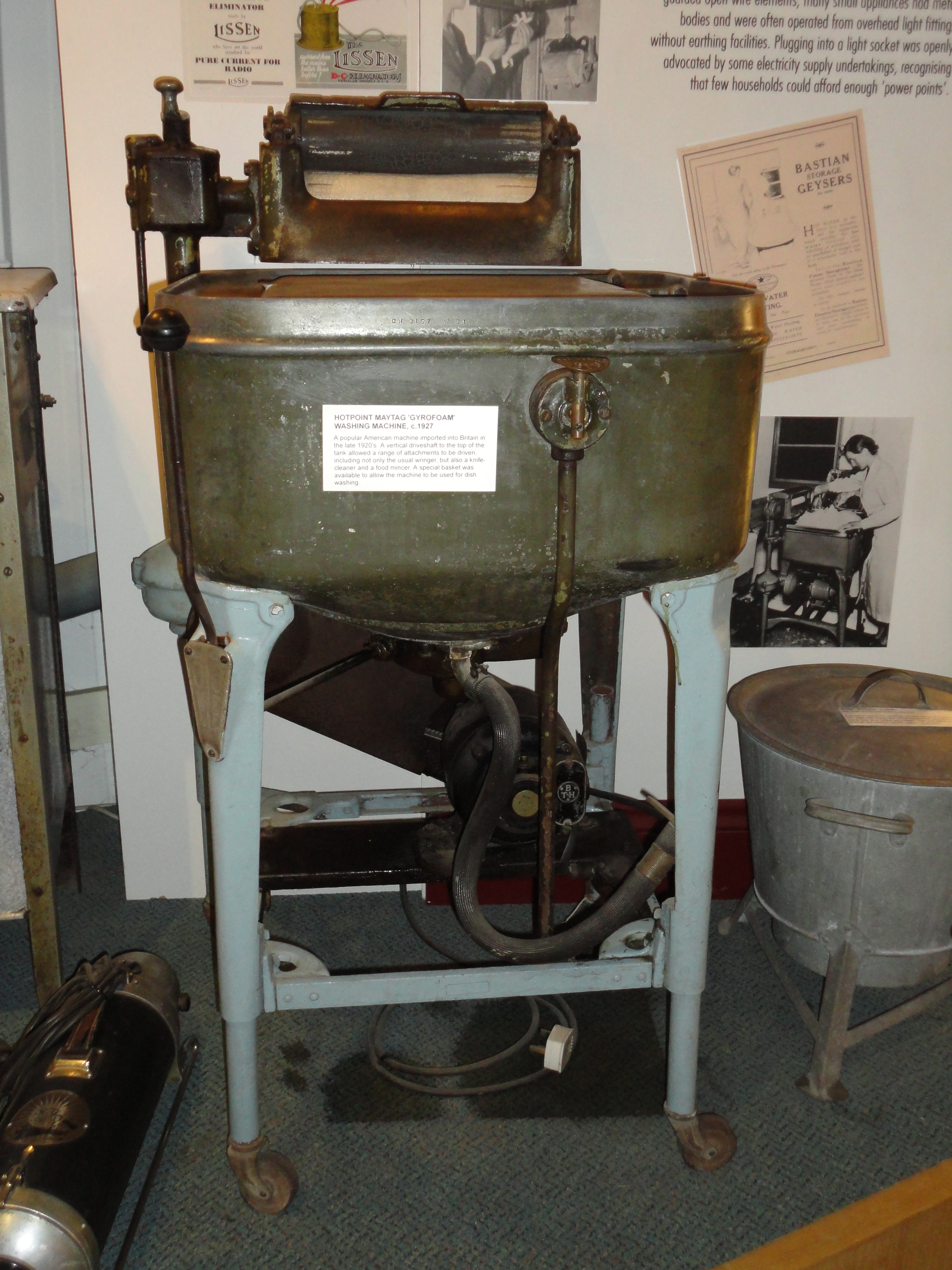
Museum exhibit in Amberley Museum. Hotpoint Maytag 'Gyrofoam' washing machine, circa 1927

On January 1, 2009, Maytag (under the ownership of the Whirlpool Corp.) changed the vested lifetime benefits of the Maytag retirees. There is a lawsuit pending in the Southern District Court of Iowa where Whirlpool has asked for permission to change the UAW bargained benefits. The benefits in question were subsequently changed despite any resolution of the lawsuit.

In August 2026, Maytag introduced a new, repairable, heavy-duty laundry pair, the Maytag Commercial Heritage traditional top-load washer (MTW8305T) and gas/electric dryer (MED8305T/MGD8305T), built at Whirlpool's two laundry plants in Clyde and Marion, Ohio. The MTW8305T washer was equipped with the mechanical DuraCore system and is engineered with a 12,000-cycle durability rating and designed to provide a 30-year operational lifespan, making it a highly reliable option designed to fight the "throwaway culture" of modern home appliances.

== Owned brands ==
- Admiral
- Amana
- Caloric
- Dynasty
- Gaffers & Sattler
- Glenwood
- Hardwick
- Holiday
- Inglis
- Jade
- JennAir
- Litton
- Magic Chef
- Menu Master
- Modern Maid
- Norge
- Sunray

== Products ==
In major appliances, Maytag was among the top three companies in the North American market, offering a full line of washing machines, dryers, dishwashers, cooktops, refrigerators, and ranges under the Maytag, JennAir, Amana, and Magic Chef brands. Maytag also used to manufacture the top load laundry for Crosley until Maytag's merger with Whirlpool.

Maytag sold multiple small appliances including a cordless iron under the Maytag brand, a mixer and blender under JennAir, the company also sold the popular Skybox and Rookie home-vending products.

In floor care, Maytag owned the Hoover brand, the former market leader in North America.

In commercial products, Maytag owned Dixie-Narco, a leader in refrigerated soft drink and specialty vending machines as well as Jade cooking products and Amana commercial cooking products.

Maytag had presence in markets around the world, including sales operations in Mexico, the United Kingdom, Japan, and Australia. The corporation's export sales and marketing, licensing of brands, and international joint ventures was coordinated by Maytag International in Schaumburg, Illinois.

Today, in the Whirlpool lineup, Maytag is mostly positioned as a mid-tier brand, generally priced somewhat above Whirlpool but below KitchenAid.

== Manufacturing plants ==
As of 2006, Maytag, by this time a division of Whirlpool Corporation, had 14 manufacturing plants throughout the United States and Mexico.

Maytag manufacturing facilities in the United States
Name	Location	Products	Operated	Notes / Refs.
Newton plant	Newton, Iowa	top-load washing machines; front-load washing machines; clothes dryers	1893–2007	Closed by Whirlpool in October 2007.
Herrin plant	Herrin, Illinois	top-load washing machines; clothes dryers	1946–2006	Acquired from Magic Chef, Inc. in 1986. Closed by Whirlpool in late 2006.
Searcy plant	Searcy, Arkansas	top-load washing machines; clothes dryers	1970–2006	Acquired from Amana Corporation in 2001. Closed by Whirlpool in late 2006.
Amana plant	Amana, Iowa	top-freezer refrigerators	1934–present	Acquired from Amana Corporation in 2001. Still operated by Whirlpool.
Cleveland plant	Cleveland, Tennessee	gas ranges	1916–present	Acquired from Magic Chef, Inc. in 1986. Still operated by Whirlpool. Relocated to a new plant in 2012.
Jackson plant	Jackson, Tennessee	dishwashers	1992–2009	Closed by Whirlpool in 2009.
Canton plant	Canton, Ohio	vacuum cleaners	1908–2007	Closed by Techtronic Industries in 2007.
Williston plant	Williston, South Carolina	vending machines	1966–present	Still operated by Crane Payment Innovations.

These also included:

- other laundry manufacturing plant in North America, in Mexico: Ciudad Juárez, Chihuahua.
- other refrigeration manufacturing plant in North America: Reynosa, Tamaulipas.
- other floor care manufacturing plants in El Paso, Texas and Ciudad Juárez, Chihuahua.
- subassembly manufacturing plant in Reynosa, Tamaulipas.

Prior to 2006, Maytag closed some facilities in the United States such as the refrigeration manufacturing plant in Galesburg, Illinois, and the former Amana cooking manufacturing plant in Florence, South Carolina.

Over the following years, Whirlpool closed Maytag plants in Newton, Iowa; Herrin, Illinois; Searcy, Arkansas; and Jackson, Tennessee. The Hoover floor care plant in Canton, Ohio was sold to Techtronic Industries, and its Dixie-Narco vending machine plant in Williston, South Carolina was acquired by Crane Merchandising Systems. (Techtronic and Crane acquired the plants when they acquired the Hoover and Dixie-Narco brands, respectively).

The remaining Maytag plants in operation today are in Cleveland, Tennessee and Amana, Iowa.*

- Whirlpool has since created a new plant in Cleveland. While holding on to a Maytag legacy workforce, the legacy buildings are no longer in use.

== Advertsing ==
=== Ol' Lonely ===
Ol' Lonely, or "the lonely repairman", is a character in Maytag advertisements, created for Maytag in 1967 by copywriter Vincent R. Vassolo of the Leo Burnett advertising agency. His character was initially played by Jesse White, who retained the role until 1988. In a time in which the laundry appliances of major manufacturers had reached maturity, differing mostly in minor details, the campaign was designed to remind consumers of the perceived added value in Maytag products derived from the brand's reputation for dependability. Maytag advertisements stated “Ol' Lonely’s predicament is testimony to the durability and reliability of Maytag appliances. Now if only he had something to do with his days.” Other ads stated, "Not all Maytag repairmen are this lonely, but we're trying." The campaign proved a huge success, allowing Maytag to set a substantial price premium, as well as strongly influencing consumer preference at the higher end of the laundry appliance market.

=== Slogans ===
One of Maytag's most recognized slogans in appliance history was "The Dependability People". Introduced in the 1970s, the tagline perfectly complemented the iconic "Ol' Lonely" Maytag Repairman commercials, before the slogan was retired in the mid-2000s when Maytag was acquired by the Whirlpool Corporation.

In 2014, Maytag introduced a new "Maytag Man" campaign featuring Colin Ferguson under the slogan "What's Inside Matters", where the character physically embodies the appliances to show off their power and reliability.

== See also ==
- Maytag Toy Racer automobiles
