= Anthony Haswell =

Anthony Haswell may refer to:

- Anthony Haswell (passenger rail advocate)
- Anthony Haswell (printer)
