= Hoover Canton plant =

- Operated: 1908–2007
- Location: 101 East Maple Street; North Canton, Ohio, United States
- Coordinates: 40°52′36″N 81°23′59″W
- Industry: Home appliances
- Products: vacuum cleaners
- Employees: 1,500 (2003)
- Area: 88 acres (36 ha)
- Volume: 1,400,000 square feet (130,000 m^{2})
- Owner: Maytag Corporation

Hoover Canton plant was an vacuum cleaner manufacturing plant in Canton, Ohio, owned by The Hoover Company, a subsidiary of Maytag Corporation. The facility was closed in 2007.

== History ==
In 1986, the Hoover family sold the company (including its North Canton plant) to the Chicago Pacific Corporation, which sold it to Maytag in 1989.

In 1996, the plant faced major labor tension when management proposed a lower third-tier wage scale to cut costs, leading union workers to reject the concessions amid prior downsizings and ongoing shifts in the manufacturing sector.

In 2003, Hoover cut roughly 200 manufacturing jobs at the plant amidst intense market competition from foreign production. Later, in late 2003, hourly workers represented by the International Brotherhood of Electrical Workers (IBEW) Local 1985 at the Hoover Company plant in North Canton, Ohio, agreed to wage and benefit concessions. In return, the union secured a job security agreement that extended their collective bargaining contract through 2008.

In 2004, parent company Maytag announced plans to move Hoover's corporate headquarters to its complex to Newton, Iowa, and cut about 500 white-collar and salaried jobs in North Canton, Ohio; the following year, the company also announced it was ending extractor production at the plant.

In 2006, the Hoover floor care plant in Canton, Ohio (along with the company) was sold to Whirlpool Corporation, which place it for sale and sold it to Techtronic Industries for $107 million in December of the same year, which was completed in early 2007.

In April 2007, TTI announced it will close its Hoover vacuum cleaner manufacturing plant in North Canton, Ohio by September of that year, and terminating 750 workers at the plant, shifting production to El Paso, Texas, and Ciudad Juárez, Mexico. The plant closed on September 27, 2007.

In early 2008, TTI sold the North Canton Hoover plant to a development partnership that included Industrial Realty Group (IRG) alongside Maple Street Commerce, with plans to redevelop the historic 85-acre industrial site into a mixed-use commercial and business hub named the Hoover District.
