= Chicago, Rock Island and Pacific Railroad =

Defunct American Class I railway

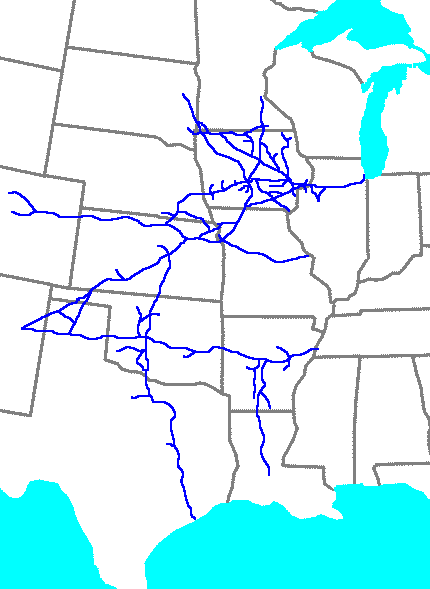
- The Rock Island System in 1965

Overview
- Headquarters: Chicago, Illinois
- Reporting mark: CRI&P, RI, ROCK
- Locale: Arkansas, Colorado, Illinois, Iowa, Kansas, Louisiana, Minnesota, Missouri, Nebraska, New Mexico, Oklahoma, South Dakota, Tennessee, and Texas
- Dates of operation: October 10, 1852–March 31, 1980
- Successor: List: CSX Transportation Chicago Pacific Corporation Union Pacific Railroad Iowa Interstate Railroad Missouri Pacific Railroad Chicago and North Western Metra Commuter Rail Burlington Northern Railroad Southern Pacific Railroad Missouri–Kansas–Texas Railroad Atchison, Topeka and Santa Fe Railway Kyle Railroad

Technical
- Track gauge: 4 ft 8 1/2 in (1,435 mm) standard gauge

The original Chicago, Rock Island and Pacific Railroad (CRI&P RW, sometimes called Chicago, Rock Island and Pacific Railway) (reporting marks CRI&P, RI, ROCK) was an American Class I railroad. It was also known as the Rock Island Line, or, in its final years, The Rock.

At the end of 1970, it operated 7,183 miles of road on 10,669 miles of track; that year it reported 20,557 million ton-miles of revenue freight and 118 million passenger miles. (Those totals may or may not include the former Burlington-Rock Island Railroad.)

"Rock Island Line", a folk song from the late 1920s, first recorded in 1934, was inspired by the railway.

== History ==
=== Incorporation ===
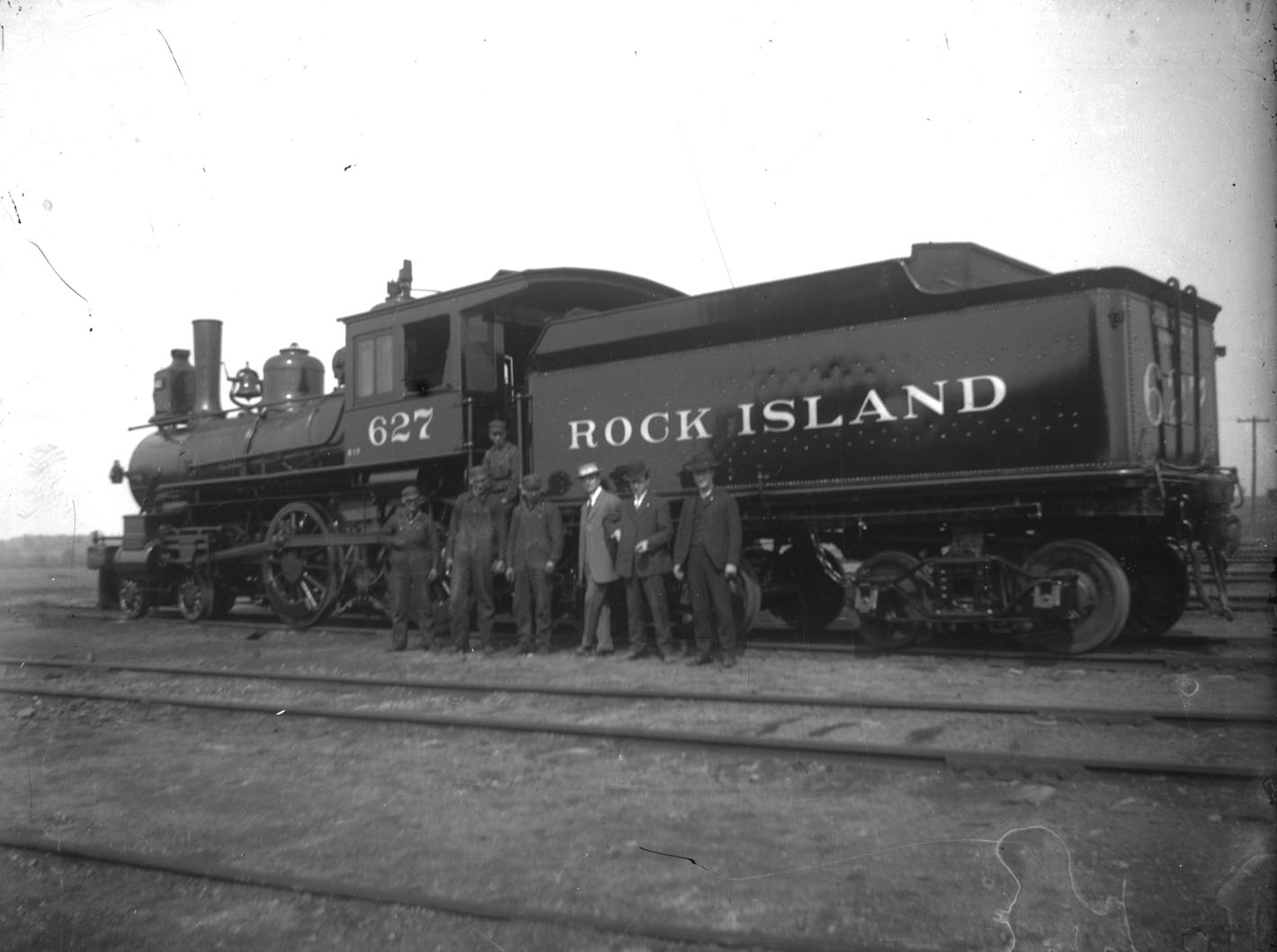
Rock Island locomotive #627, circa 1910

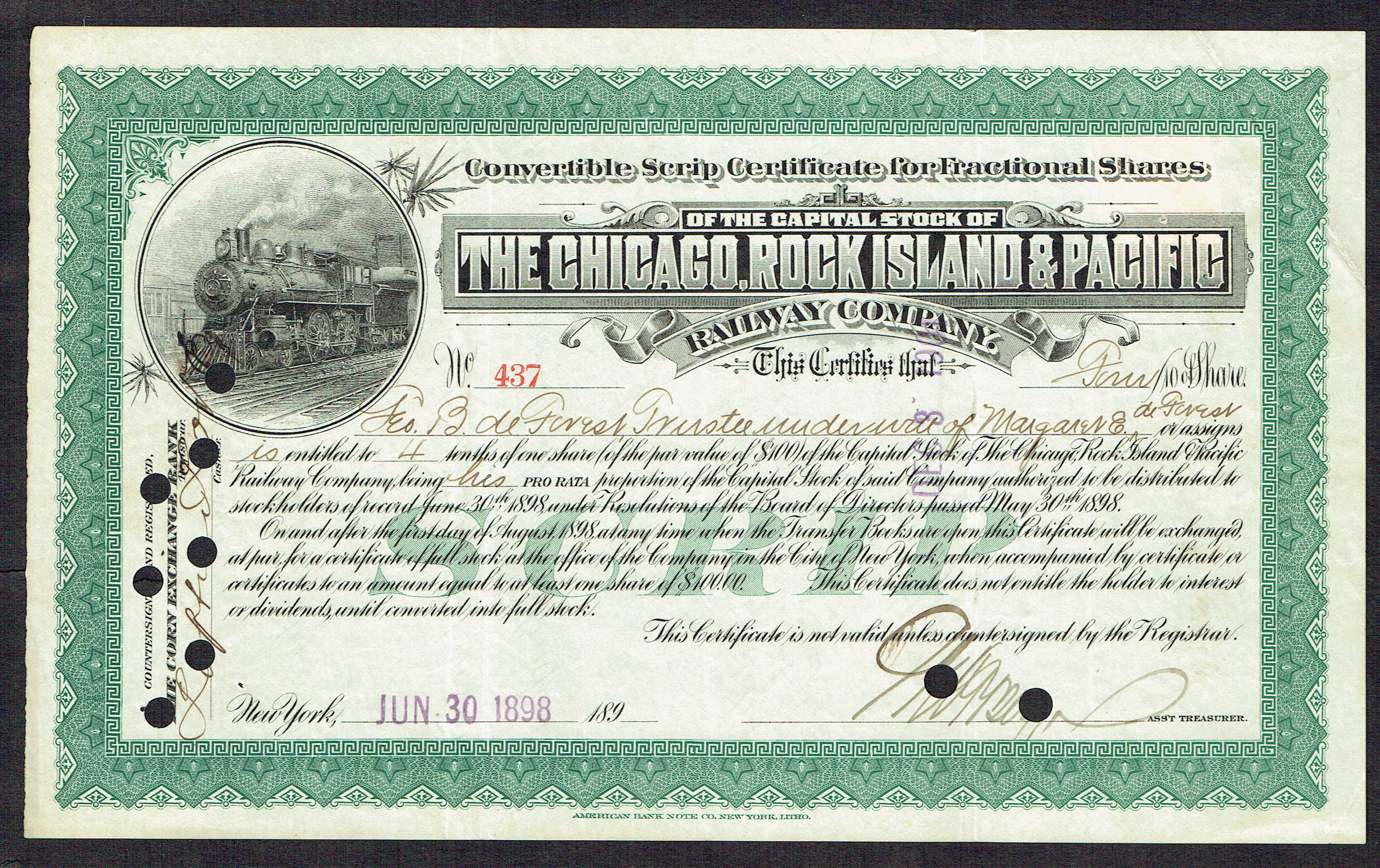
Fractional Share of the Chicago, Rock Island & Pacific Railway Company, issued June 30, 1898

Its predecessor, the Rock Island and La Salle Railroad Company, was incorporated in Illinois on February 27, 1847, and an amended charter was approved on February 7, 1851, as the Chicago and Rock Island Railroad. Construction began in Chicago on October 1, 1851, and the first train was operated on October 10, 1852, between Chicago and Joliet. Construction continued on through La Salle, and Rock Island was reached on February 22, 1854, becoming the first railroad to connect Chicago with the Mississippi River.

In Iowa, the C&RI's incorporators created (on February 5, 1853) the Mississippi and Missouri Railroad Company (M&M), to run from Davenport to Council Bluffs, and on November 20, 1855, the first train to operate in Iowa steamed from Davenport to Muscatine. The Mississippi River bridge between Rock Island and Davenport was completed on April 22, 1856.

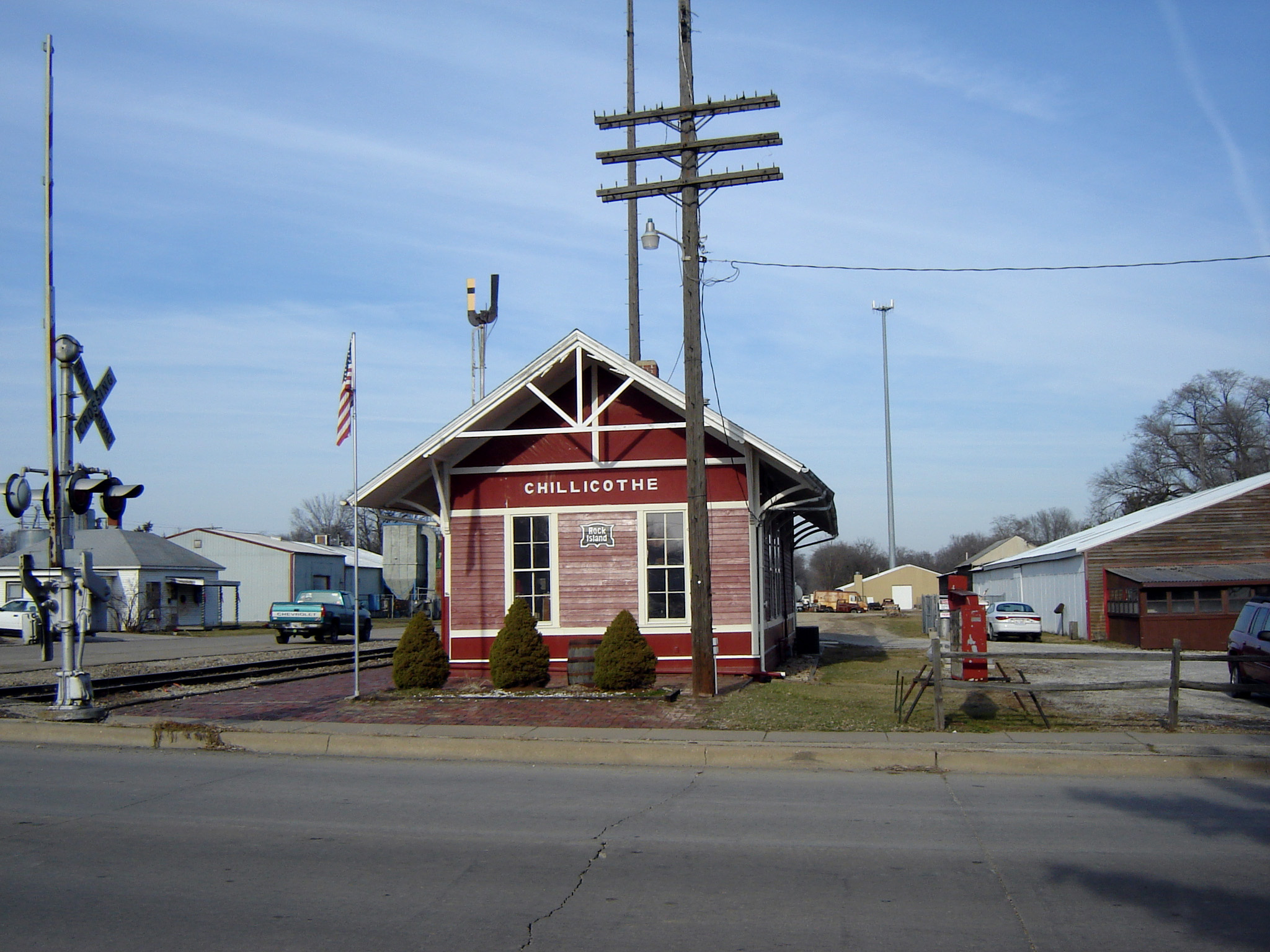
The former Rock Island Depot at Chillicothe, Illinois, now a railroad museum

On May 6, 1856, the steamboat Effie Afton ran into the Rock Island's Mississippi River Bridge. The steamboat was overcome by a fire, which also destroyed a span of the bridge. This accident caused a series of court cases. In one of the cases, Abraham Lincoln, a lawyer at the time, represented the Rock Island. Lincoln argued that not only was the steamboat at fault in striking the bridge, but that bridges across navigable rivers were to the advantage of the country.

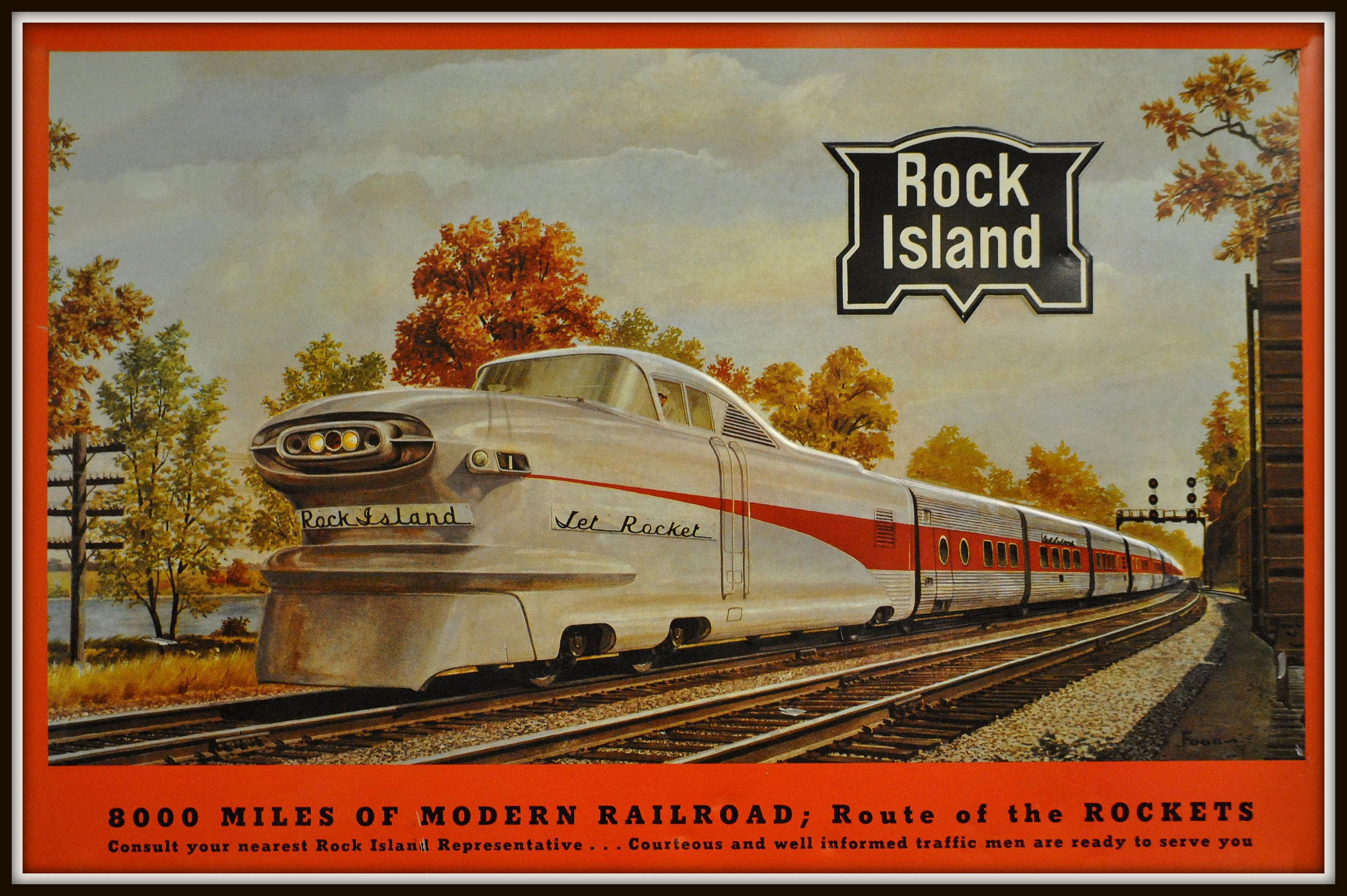
Aerotrain advertisement

The M&M was acquired by the C&RI on July 9, 1866, to form the Chicago, Rock Island and Pacific Railroad Company. In 1877 Ransom Reed Cable became a director and in 1883 replaced Hugh Riddle as president, retiring as Chairman of the Board in 1902. The railroad expanded through construction and acquisitions in the following decades.

On March 21, 1910, the Green Mountain train wreck resulted when a Rock Island Railroad passenger train derailed, killing 52 passengers and severely injuring scores of others.

The railroad retired its last steam locomotive from service in 1953.

=== Territory ===
The Rock Island stretched across Arkansas, Colorado, Illinois, Iowa, Kansas, Louisiana, Minnesota, Missouri, Nebraska, New Mexico, Oklahoma, South Dakota, and Texas. The easternmost reach of the system was Chicago, and the system also reached Memphis, Tennessee. To the west, it reached Denver, Colorado, and Santa Rosa, New Mexico. Southernmost reaches were to Galveston, Texas, and Eunice, Louisiana, while in a northerly direction, the Rock Island got as far as Minneapolis, Minnesota. Major lines included Minneapolis to Kansas City, Missouri, via Des Moines, Iowa; St. Louis, Missouri Meta, Missouri, to Santa Rosa via Kansas City; Herington, Kansas, to Galveston, Texas, via Fort Worth, Texas, and Dallas, Texas; and Santa Rosa to Memphis. The heaviest traffic was on the Chicago-to-Rock Island and Rock Island-to-Muscatine lines.

=== Intercity passenger service ===
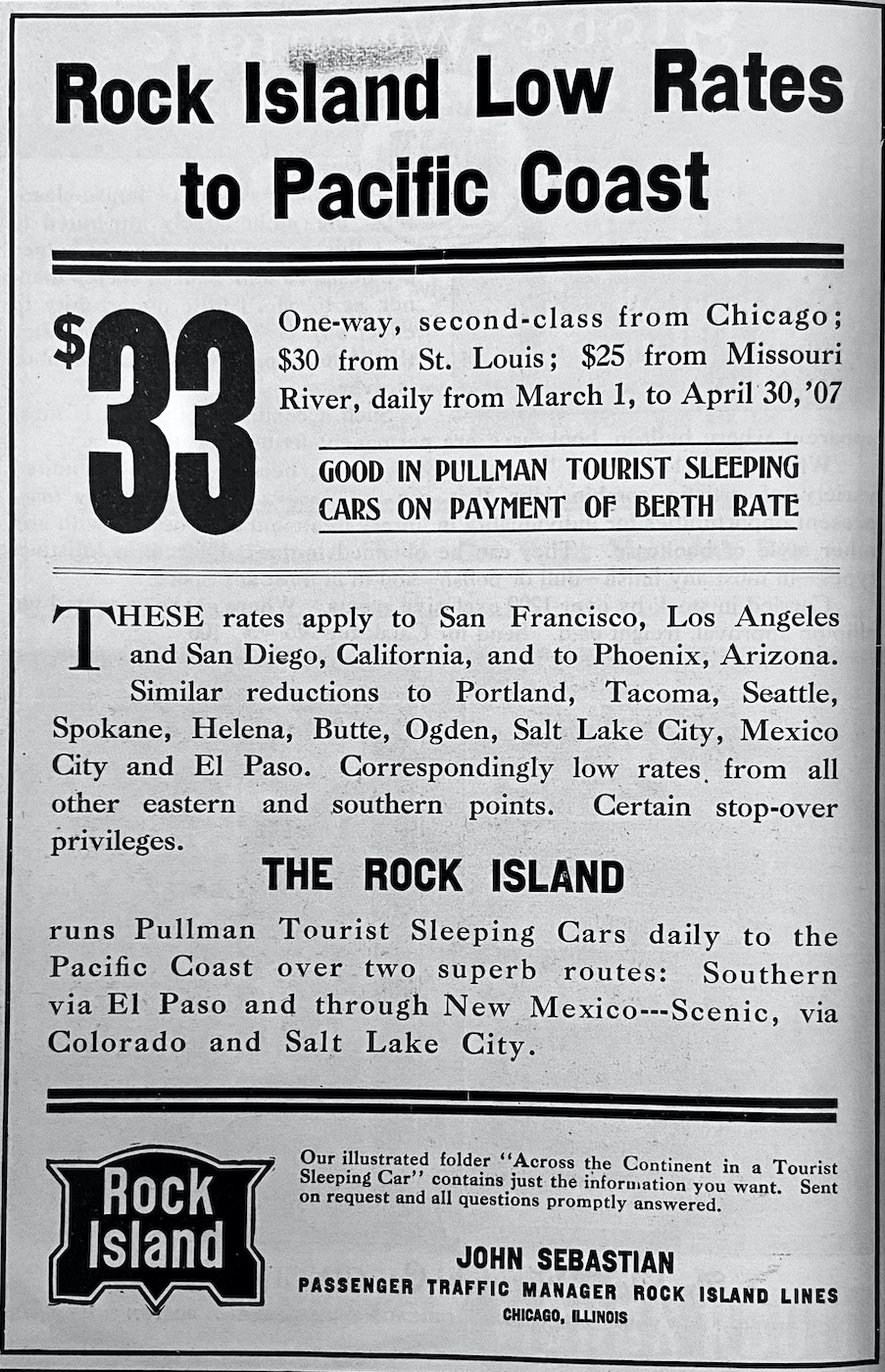
A 1907 advertisement for travel between Chicago and the Pacific Coast

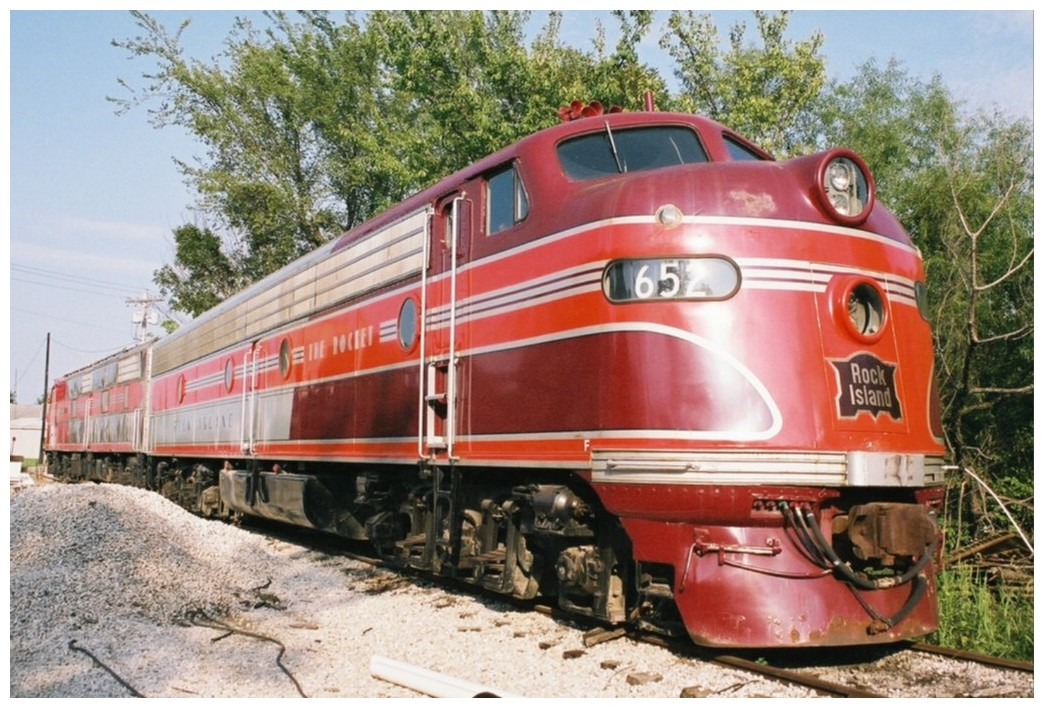
Rock Island E8 #652 with E6 #630 at Midland Railway, Baldwin City, Kansas

In common with most American railroad companies, the Rock Island once operated an extensive passenger service. The primary routes served were: Chicago-Los Angeles, Chicago-Denver, Memphis-Little Rock-Oklahoma City-Tucumcari, and Minneapolis-Dallas. The Rock Island ran both limited and local service on those routes, as well as locals on many other lines on its system. In 1937, the Rock Island introduced diesel power to its passenger service, with the purchase of six lightweight Rocket streamliners.

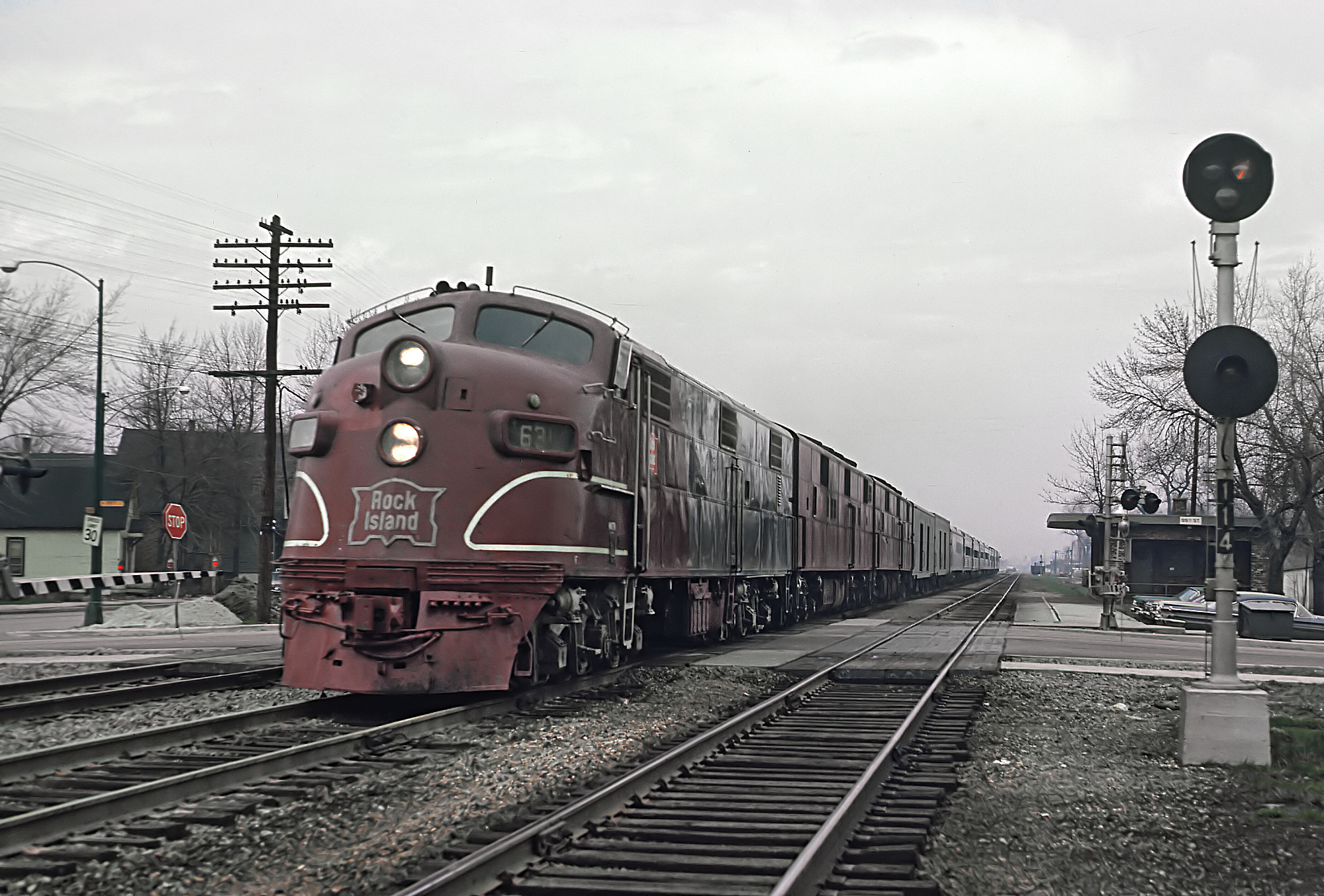
The Golden State at 99th Street in Washington Heights on the Rock Island mainline in April 1965

In competition with the Santa Fe Chiefs, the Rock Island jointly operated the Golden State Limited (Chicago—Kansas City—Tucumcari—El Paso—Los Angeles) with the Southern Pacific Railroad (SP) from 1902 to 1968. On this route, the Rock Island's train was marketed as a "low-altitude" crossing of the Continental Divide. The Rock Island did not concede to the Santa Fe's dominance in the Chicago–Los Angeles travel market and re-equipped the train with new streamlined equipment in 1948. At the same time, the Limited was dropped from the train's name and the train was thereafter known as the Golden State. The local run on this line was known as the Imperial, which had a branch operating through the northwestern edge of Mexico.

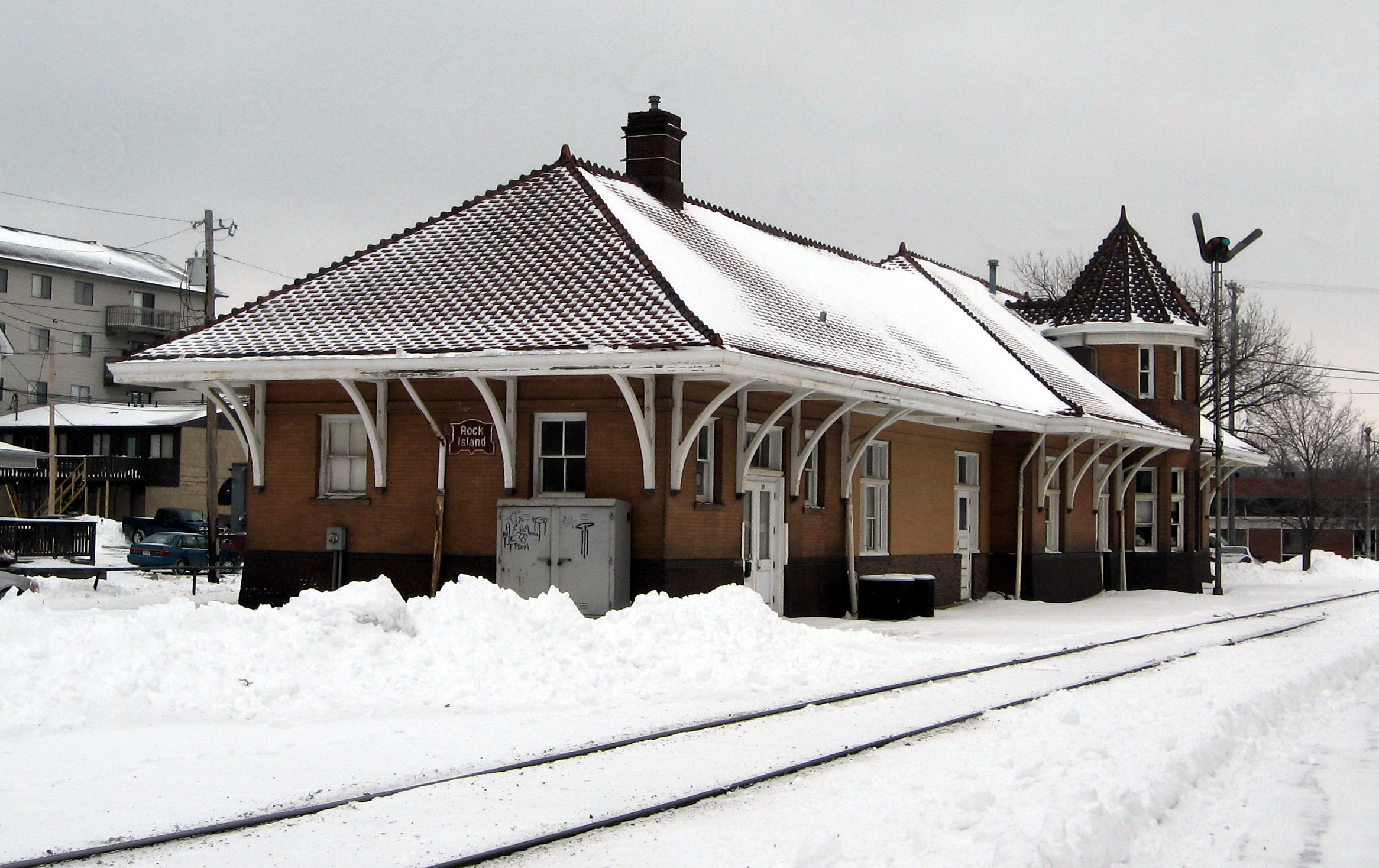
Iowa City Depot, once part of the Rock Island system

The 1948 modernization of the Golden State occurred with some controversy. In 1947, both the Rock Island and Southern Pacific jointly advertised the coming of a new entry in the Chicago-Los Angeles travel market. The Golden Rocket was scheduled to closely match the Santa Fe's transit time end-to-end and was to have its own dedicated trainsets, one purchased by the Rock Island, the other by Southern Pacific. As the Rock Island's set of streamlined passenger cars was being finished, the Southern Pacific abruptly withdrew its purchase. The Rock Island's cars were delivered and found their way into the Golden State's fleet soon after delivery.

The Golden State was the last first-class train on the Rock Island, retaining its dining cars and sleeping cars until its last run on February 21, 1968.

The Rock Island also competed with the Chicago, Burlington and Quincy railroad in the Chicago-to-Denver market. While the Q fielded its Zephyrs on the route, the Rock Island ran the Rocky Mountain Rocket. The RMR split at Limon, Colorado, with half the train diverting to Colorado Springs, an operation known as the "Limon Shuffle". The Rock Island conceded nothing to its rival, even installing ABS signaling on the route west of Lincoln in an effort to maintain transit speed. The train was also re-equipped with streamlined equipment in 1948.

As the Rocky Mountain Rocket was downgraded due to nonrail competition, the route traveled by the train was gradually shortened from 1966 onward. Its western terminus was cut back first to Omaha, then to Council Bluffs. After briefly running without a name, it was renamed The Cornhusker. Finally, in 1970, the train was cut back to a Chicago-Rock Island run entirely within the confines of the state of Illinois and renamed the Quad Cities Rocket.

Other trains operated by the Rock Island as part of its Rocket fleet included the Corn Belt Rocket (Chicago—Des Moines—Omaha), the Des Moines-Omaha Limited (Chicago-Des Moines-Omaha), the Twin Star Rocket (Minneapolis—St. Paul—Des Moines—Kansas City—Oklahoma City—Fort Worth—Dallas—Houston), the Zephyr Rocket (Minneapolis—St. Paul—Burlington—St. Louis), the Choctaw Rocket (Memphis—Little Rock—Oklahoma City—Amarillo) and the Cherokee (a local counterpart to the Choctaw Rocket, Memphis-Little Rock-Oklahoma City-Amarillo-Tucumcari-Los Angeles).

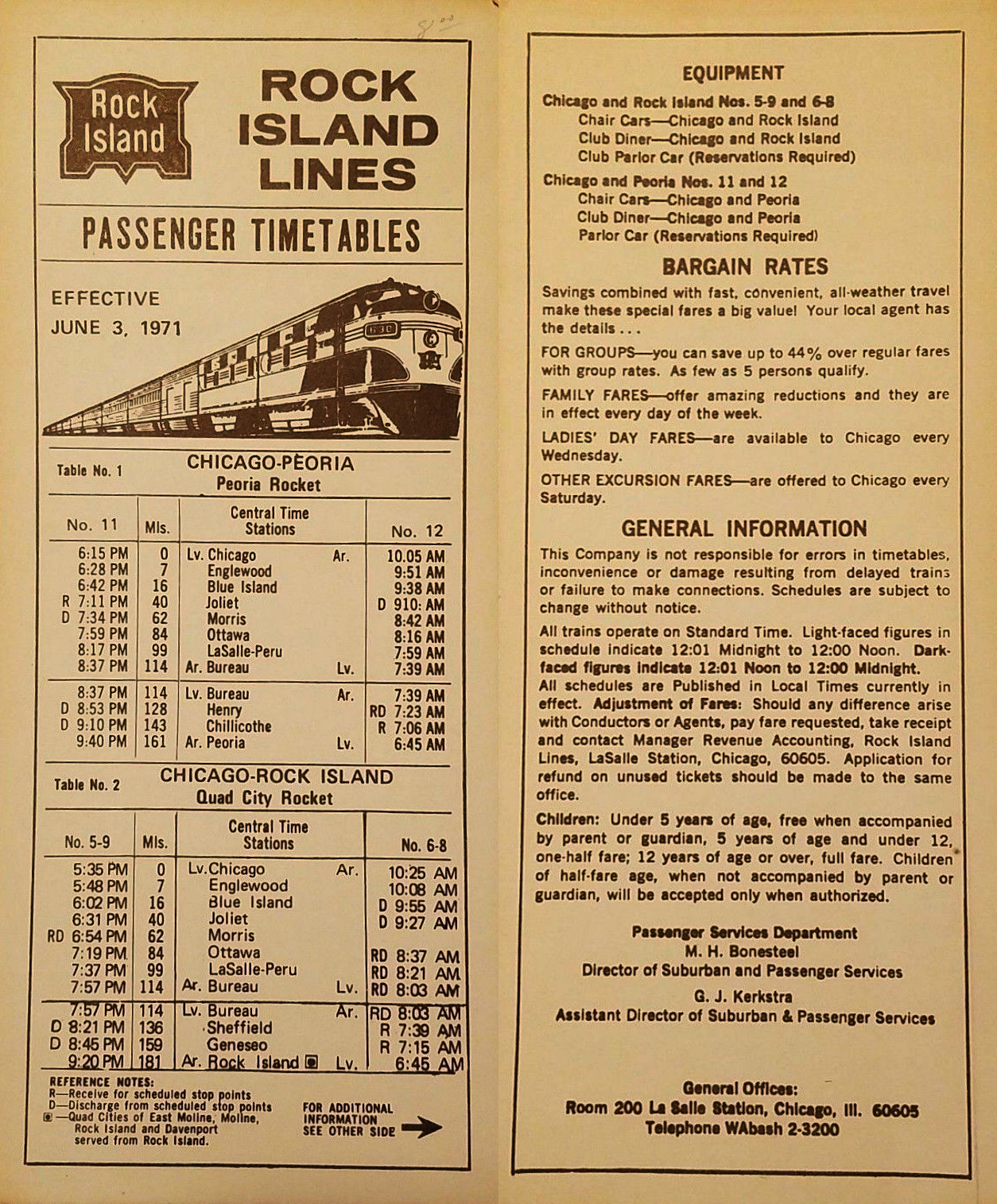
One of the last passenger timetables issued by the Chicago, Rock Island and Pacific Railroad: The Rock Island did not join Amtrak on May 1, 1971, and continued to operate its own passenger service until 1978.

By the time Amtrak was formed in 1971, the once-proud Rock Island was down to just two intercity trains, the Chicago-Peoria Peoria Rocket and the Chicago-Rock Island Quad Cities Rocket, both of which now operated entirely within the borders of Illinois. However, the Rock Island opted against joining Amtrak, in part because the government assessed the Amtrak entrance fee based upon passenger miles operated in 1970. After concluding that the cost of joining would be greater than remaining in the passenger business, the railroad decided to "perform a public service for the state of Illinois" and continue intercity passenger operations. To help manage the service, the Rock Island hired National Association of Railroad Passengers founder Anthony Haswell as managing director of passenger services.

The last two trains plied the Rock Island's Illinois Division as the track quality declined from 1971 through 1977. The transit times, once a speedy 2½ hours in the 1950s, had lengthened to a 4½ hour run by 1975. The State of Illinois continued to subsidize the service to keep it running. The track program of 1978 helped with main-line timekeeping, although the Rock Island's management decreed that the two trains were not to delay freight traffic on the route. By this time, both once-proud trains were down to just two coaches, powered by EMD E8 locomotives entering their second decade of service. With the trains frequently running with as many paying passengers as coaches in the train, Illinois withdrew its subsidy, and the two trains made their final runs on December 31, 1978.

=== Chicago commuter service ===
The Rock Island also operated an extensive commuter train service in the Chicago area. The primary route ran from LaSalle Street Station to Joliet along the main line, and a spur line, known as the "Suburban Line" to Blue Island. The main-line trains supplanted the long-distance services that did not stop at the numerous stations on that route. The Suburban Line served the Beverly area of Chicago as a branch leaving the main line at Gresham and heading due west, paralleling the Baltimore and Ohio Chicago Terminal Railroad passenger line before turning south. The Suburban Line made stops every four blocks along the way before rejoining the main line at Western Avenue Junction in Blue Island.

From the 1920s on, the suburban services were operated using Pacific-type 4-6-2 locomotives and specially designed light-heavyweight coaches that with their late 1920s build dates became known as the "Capone" cars. The suburban service became well known in the diesel era, as the steam power was replaced, first with new EMD FP7s and ALCO RS-3s, with two Fairbanks-Morse units added later. In 1949, Pullman-built 2700-series cars arrived as the first air-conditioned commuter cars on the line.

In the 1960s, the Rock Island tried to upgrade the suburban service with newer equipment at lower cost. Second-hand Aerotrains, while less than successful in intercity service, were purchased to provide further air-conditioned accommodations that had proven popular with the 2700 series cars.

When the Milwaukee Road purchased new Budd Company stainless-steel, bilevel cars in 1961, the Rock Island elected to add to a subsequent order and took delivery of its first bilevel equipment in 1964. Power for these new cars was provided by orphaned passenger units: three EMD F7s, an EMD E6, and the two EMD AB6s. The engines were rebuilt with head end power to provide heat, air conditioning, and lighting for the new cars. In 1970, another order, this time for Pullman-built bilevel cars arrived to further supplement the fleet. To provide the power for these cars, several former Union Pacific EMD E8 and EMD E9 diesels were also rebuilt with head end power and added to the commuter pool.

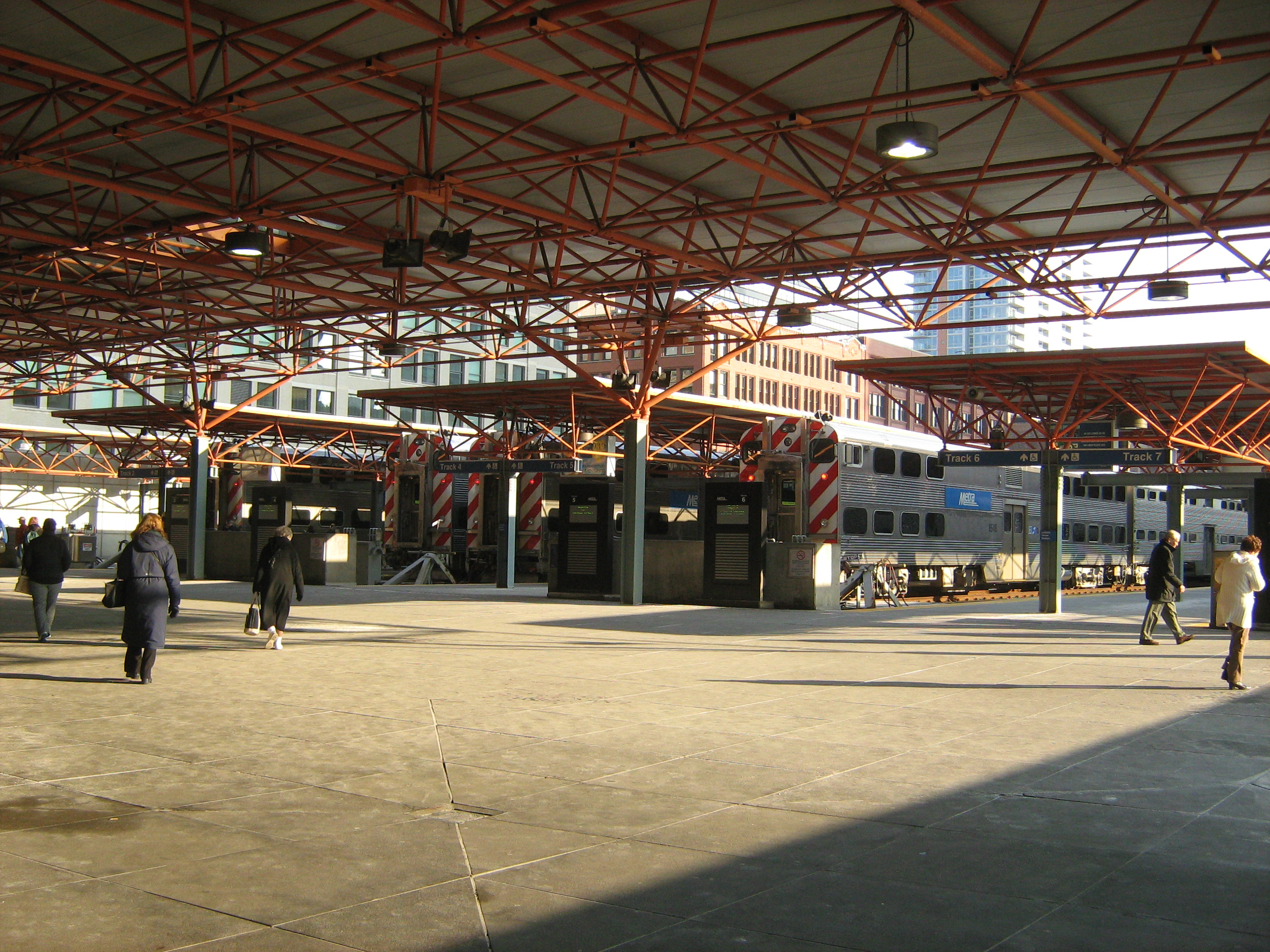
The outdoor passenger concourse and platforms of LaSalle Street Station as built and operated by Metra. The trains shown are commuter runs to Blue Island and Joliet, Illinois.

The commuter service was not exempt from the general decline of the Rock Island through the 1970s. Over time, deferred maintenance took its toll on both track and rolling stock. On the Rock Island, the Capone cars were entering their sixth decade of service and the nearly 30-year-old 2700s suffered from severe corrosion due to the steel used in their construction. LaSalle Street Station, the service's downtown terminal, suffered from neglect and urban decay with the slab roof of the train shed literally falling apart, requiring its removal. By this time, the Rock Island could not afford to replace the clearly worn-out equipment.

In 1976, the entire Chicago commuter rail system began to receive financial support from the state of Illinois through the Regional Transportation Authority. Operating funds were disbursed to all commuter operators, and the Rock Island was to be provided with new equipment to replace the tired 2700 series and Capone cars. New Budd bilevels that were near copies of the 1961 Milwaukee Road cars arrived in 1978. New EMD F40PH units arrived in late 1977 and, in summer, 1978, briefly could be seen hauling Capone cars. The Rock Island's commuter F and E units were relegated to freight service or the scrapyard.

With the 1980 end of the Rock Island, the RTA purchased the suburban territory and remaining Rock Island commuter equipment from the estate, while the Chicago and North Western Railway took over operations for a year before the RTA began operating it directly in 1981. LaSalle Street Station was torn down and replaced with the Chicago Stock Exchange building, with a smaller commuter station located one block south of the old station. The RTA gradually rebuilt the track and added more new equipment to the service, leaving the property in better shape than it was in the Rock Island's heyday, albeit with less track. The Rock Island District, as the Rock Island's suburban service is now known, now operates as part of Metra, the Chicago commuter rail agency.

=== Rock Island's survival challenge ===
The Rock Island hit its peak under the presidency of John Dow Farrington, from 1948 to 1955. As the aura from those days waned in the late 1950s, the Rock Island found itself faced with flat traffic and revenues, and increasing costs. Despite this, the property was still in decent shape, making the Rock Island an attractive bride for another line looking to expand the reach of its current system.

The Rock Island was known as "one railroad too many" in the plains states, basically serving the same territory as the Burlington, only over a longer route. The Midwest rail network had been built in the late 19th century to serve that era's traffic. The mechanization of grain hauling gave larger reach to large grain elevators, reducing the need for the tight web of track that crisscrossed the plains states such as Iowa. As for available overhead traffic, in 1958, no less than six Class I carriers were serving as eastern connections for the Union Pacific at Omaha, all seeking a slice of the flood of western traffic that UP interchanged there. Under the ICC revenue rules in place at the time, the Rock Island sought traffic from Omaha, yet preferred to keep the long haul to Denver, where interchange could be made with the Denver and Rio Grande Western, a connection to the Western Pacific for haulage to the West Coast.

The only option for the Rock Island to grow revenues and absorb costs was to merge with another, perhaps more prosperous railroad. Overtures were made from fellow Midwest granger line C&NW, as well as the granger turned transcon Milwaukee Road. Both of these never advanced much beyond the data gathering and initial study phases. In 1964, its last profitable year, the Rock Island agreed to pursue a merger plan with the UP, which would form one large "super" railroad stretching from Chicago to the West Coast.

Facing the loss of the UP's traffic at the Omaha gateway, virtually every railroad directly and indirectly affected by the potential UP/Rock Island merger immediately filed protests to block it. With these filings began the longest and most complicated merger case in Interstate Commerce Commission history. Faced with failing granger railroads and large Class I railroads seeking to expand, ICC Hearing Examiner Nathan Klitenic, presiding over the case, sought to balance the opposing forces and completely restructure the railroads west of the Mississippi River.

=== The UP-RI merger case ===
After 10 years of hearings and tens of thousands of pages of testimony and exhibits produced, Klitenic, now an administrative law judge, approved the Rock Island-Union Pacific merger as part of a larger plan for rail service throughout the West. Under Klitenic's proposal, almost all of the Rock Island, including the Chicago-Omaha main line, would go to the Union Pacific. The Kansas City-Tucumcari Golden State route would be sold to the Southern Pacific. The Memphis-Amarillo Choctaw route would be sold to the Santa Fe. The Rio Grande would have an option to purchase the Denver-Kansas City line.

During most of the ensuing merger process, Rock Island operated at a financial loss. In 1965, Rock Island earned its last profit. With the merger with Union Pacific seemingly so close, the Rock Island cut expenses to conserve cash. Expenditures on track maintenance were cut, passenger service was reduced as fast as the ICC would allow, and locomotives received only basic maintenance to keep them running. The Rock Island began to take on a ramshackle appearance and derailments occurred with increasing frequency. In an effort to prop up its future merger mate, UP asked the Rock Island to forsake the Denver gateway in favor of increased interchange at Omaha. Incredibly, the Rock Island refused this, and the UP routed more Omaha traffic over the Chicago and North Western.

As a result, by 1974, the Rock Island was no longer the attractive prospect it had once been in the 1950s. The cost-cutting measures enacted to conserve cash for the merger left the Rock Island property in such a state that the Union Pacific viewed the expense of bringing it back to viable operating condition to be severely prohibitive. Additionally, the ICC attached conditions for both labor and operating concessions that the UP deemed too excessive for their tastes. These factors led the Union Pacific to walk away from the deal later in 1974.

From the vantage point of the 1974 railroad industry, Klitenic's plan was viewed as an unmanageable and far too radical solution to both the granger railroad issue and the larger issue of the future of rail freight transportation in general. The visionary plan would not be realized until the megamergers of the 1990s with the BNSF Railway and Union Pacific remaining as the two surviving major rail carriers west of the Mississippi.

=== The Rock Island's last attempt to survive ===
The Rock Island Line’s logo as “The Rock”, used from May 1975 to 1980

In 1975, the road adopted a new color scheme and rebranded itself as "The Rock." #4340 was among several EMD GP38-2 units acquired by the Missouri Pacific Railroad when the Rock Island shut down in 1980, and became MoPac #2278.

Now set free and adrift, both operationally and financially, the Rock Island assessed its options. It hired a new president and CEO, John W. Ingram, a former Federal Railway Administration (FRA) official. Ingram quickly sought to improve efficiency and sought FRA loans for the rebuild of the line, but finances caught up with the Rock Island all too quickly. With only $300 of cash on hand, on March 17, 1975, Rock Island entered its third bankruptcy under Chapter 77 of the Federal Bankruptcy Act. William M. Gibbons was selected as receiver and trustee by Judge Frank J. McGarr, with whom Gibbons had practiced law in the early 1960s.

With its debts on hold, Rock Island charted a new course as a grain funnel from the Midwest to the port of Galveston, Texas. The Ingram administration estimated that the Rock Island could be rebuilt and re-equipped at a cost of $100 million and sought financing for the plan. Grain shuttles that had no cabooses at the end of their trains became a cost-effective way to gain market share and help finance the plan internally.

Nevertheless, new and rebuilt locomotives arrived on the property in gleaming powder blue and white to replace some of the tired, filthy power. Track rebuild projects covered the system. Main lines that had seen little or no maintenance in years were pulled from the mud. Rail and tie replacement programs attacked the maintenance backlog. This coincided with a massive campaign beginning in May 1975 to rebrand the railroad as simply “The Rock”, with modern eye-catching livery. However, the FRA-backed loans that Ingram sought were thwarted by the lobbying efforts of competing railroads, which saw a healthy Rock Island as a threat to their own survival. By 1978, main line track improved in quality. For example, at the end of that summer, the Illinois Division had no slow orders, and freight velocity was rising. The sale of the Golden State Route to the Southern Pacific had been agreed to. The Rock Island slowly inched towards a financial break-even point, despite the economic malaise that plagued the late 1970s.

Creditors, such as Henry Crown, advocated for the shutdown and liquidation of the property. Crown declared that the Rock Island was not capable of operating profitably, much less paying its outstanding debts. At the same time, Crown invested as much as he could in Rock Island bonds and other debt at bankruptcy-induced junk status prices.

For the previous two years, while the Rock Island invested heavily into its physical plant, the Rock Island brotherhoods had been working under labor agreements that were no longer valid. The front line operating employees had not had an increase in pay since the existing contracts expired yet remained on the job during extensive contract negotiations. By the summer of 1979, the Brotherhood of Locomotive Engineers and the United Transportation Union had accepted new agreements. The Brotherhood of Railway and Airline Clerks (BRAC) held firm to their demand that pay increases be back dated to the expiration date of the previous agreement.

The Rock Island offered to open the books to show the precarious financial condition of the road in an effort to get the BRAC in line with the other unions that had already signed agreements. Fred J. Kroll, president of the BRAC, declined the offer to audit the books of the Rock Island. Kroll pulled his BRAC clerks off the job in August, 1979. Picket lines went up at every terminal on the Rock Island's system and the operating brotherhoods honored the picket lines. The Rock Island ground to a halt.

The Ingram management team operated as much of the Rock Island as they could. Trains slowly began to move, with more traffic being hauled every week of the strike. President Jimmy Carter issued a back-to-work order that BRAC dismissed. Still more traffic flowed on the strikebound Rock Island. According to Ingram, "by the end of the sixth week, the Rock Island was handling about 30 percent of its prestrike tonnage with 5 percent of the prestrike onboard train operating personnel. Projections indicated that by the end of November, the company would be handling about half of its prestrike tonnage and earning a profit of about $5 million per month. In other words, the company was winning the strike." Seeing the trains rolling despite the strike and fearing a Florida East Coast strikebreaking situation, the unions appealed to the FRA and ICC for relief. Despite the fact that Rock Island management had been able to move 80% of pre-strike tonnage, at the behest of the Carter Administration, the ICC declared a transportation emergency, finding that the Rock Island would not be able to move the 1979 grain harvest to market. This decision came despite the railroad's movement of more grain out of Iowa in the week immediately preceding the order than during any week in its history. The ICC issued a Directed Service Order authorizing the Kansas City Terminal Railway to take over operations.

The Directed Service Order enabled one-time suitors, via KCT management, to basically test operate portions of the Rock Island that had once interested them. On January 24, 1980, Judge McGarr elected to not review the Rock Island's final plan of reorganization. He simply initiated the shutdown and liquidation of the Rock Island, which was what Henry Crown had advocated for from the very beginning. Not wanting to preside over an asset sale, Rock Island president John W. Ingram resigned, and Gibbons took over as president of the bankrupt railroad.

Kansas City Terminal began the process of embargoing in-bound shipments in late February, and the final train battled three days of snow drifts to arrive in Denver on March 31, 1980. Cars and locomotives were gathered in 'ghost trains' that appeared on otherwise defunct Rock Island lines and accumulated at major terminals and shops and prepared for sale.

== Legacy ==
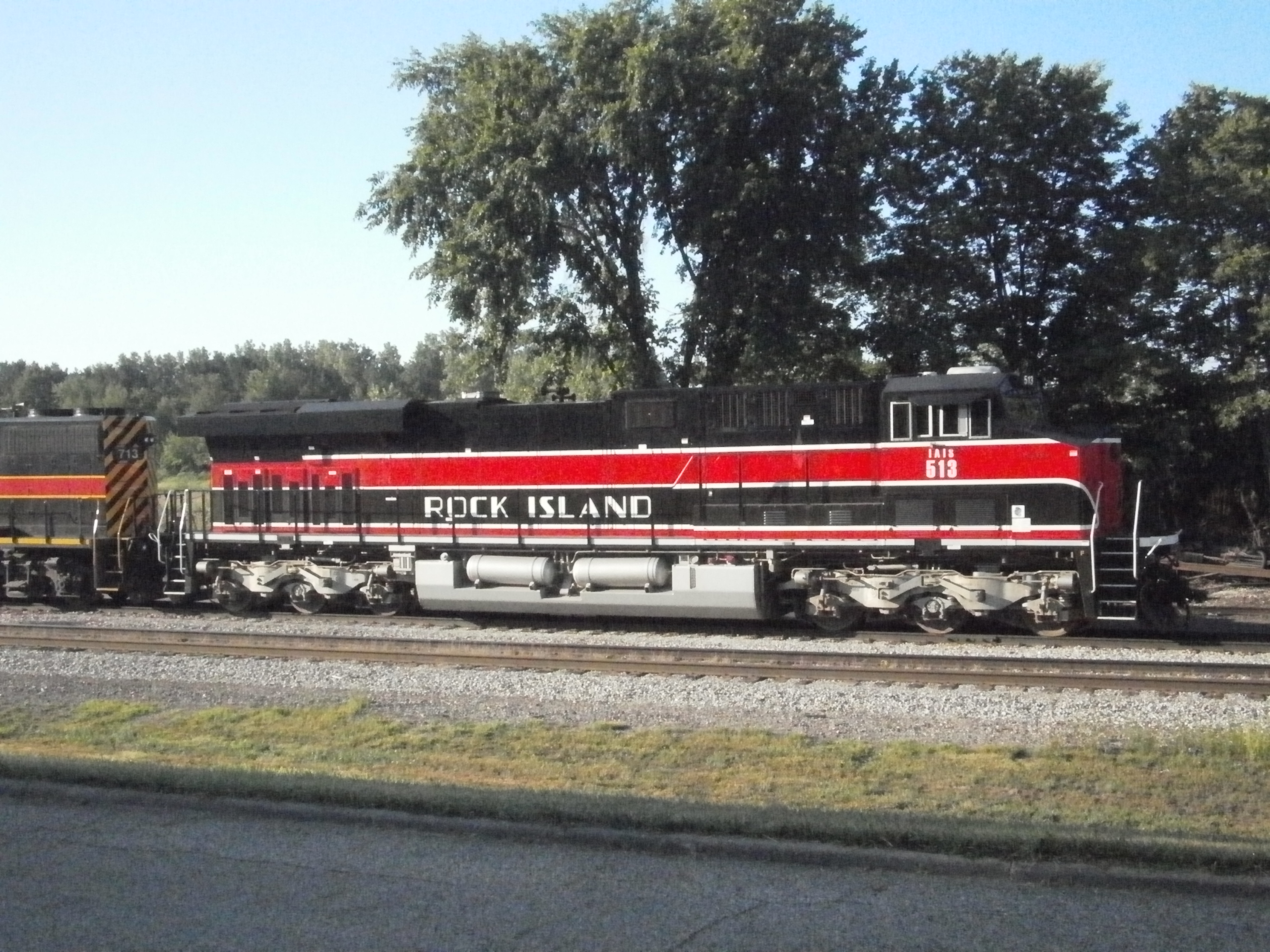
Iowa Interstate's ES44AC #513 in "Rock Island" heritage colors rolls through the "Y" at Bureau Junction, Illinois, hauling coal from Peoria, Illinois, to Cedar Rapids, Iowa

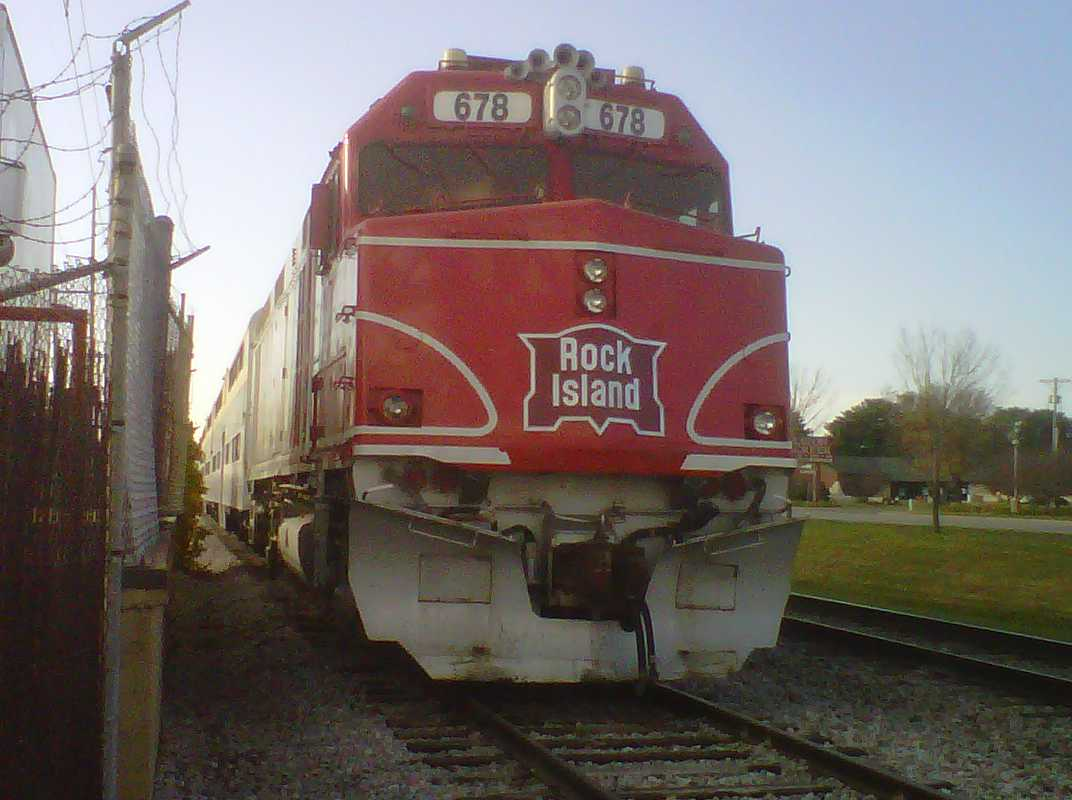
Iowa Northern Railway engine 678 (since scrapped) at Coralville, Iowa, painted in Rock Island livery as a memorial

The railroad's locomotives, rail cars, equipment, tracks, and real estate were sold to other railroads or to scrappers. Gibbons was able to raise more than $500 million in the liquidation, paying off all the railroad's creditors, bondholders and all other debts in full at face value with interest. Henry Crown was ultimately proven correct, as both he and other bondholders who had purchased Rock Island debt for cents on the dollar during the low ebb in prices did especially well. The line from the end of commuter service in Blue Island to Bureau Junction was leased to the Chessie System (later CSX). The Chicago and North Western acquired the line between the Twin Cities and Kansas City. The line between Tucumcari and St. Louis was acquired by the Cotton Belt. The Choctaw Route was sold in pieces. The line between Herington, Kansas and Fort Worth, Texas was sold to the Oklahoma, Kansas and Texas Railroad. The line between Peoria, Illinois, Bureau Junction and Omaha, Nebraska was acquired by the Iowa Interstate Railroad.

Gibbons was released from the Rock Island on June 1, 1984, after its estate expired. With all assets sold and all debt retired, the Rock Island found itself with a large infusion of cash. The name of the company was changed to Chicago Pacific Corporation to further distance itself from the defunct railroad. Its first purchase was vacuum maker Hoover Company. In 1988, the company was acquired by the Maytag Corporation.

Ironically, through the megamergers of the 1990s, the Union Pacific ultimately ended up owning and operating more of the Rock Island than it would have acquired in its attempted 1964 merger. The one line it currently does not own (or operate regularly, other than detours) is the Chicago-to-Omaha main line that drove it to merge with the Rock Island in the first place. This line now prospers under the Iowa Interstate Railroad.

The company inspired the song "Rock Island Line", first written in 1934 and recorded by numerous artists.

A spur of the Rock Island Railroad that ran beside a small hotel in Eldon, Missouri, owned by the grandmother of Mrs. Paul (Ruth) Henning also inspired the popular television show Petticoat Junction in the early 1960s. Ruth Henning is listed as a co-creator of the show, along with her husband Paul, who also created The Beverly Hillbillies and executive produced Jay Sommers's Green Acres.

The Rock Island Line Workshop, located in Silvis, Illinois, is now home to the Railroading Heritage of Midwest America (RRHMA), a non-profit railroad preservation organization. Built in 1903, this was the railroad's largest workshop, sitting on a 900-acre site between the railroad's main line and the Chicago, Burlington and Quincy Railroad's Rock Island branch. After the closing in 1980, the workshop was sold to National Railway Equipment, and it remained a maintenance and refurbishment hub for the wider North American railroad industry. NRE sold the facility to the RRHMA in late 2021, and plans call for the refurbishment of the facility to maintain steam, heritage diesel and associated rolling stock, in addition to developing a museum on the site.

=== Reestablishment ===
In 2017, thirty-seven years after the Rock Island folded, a new startup company that claims to own the rights to the Chicago, Rock Island and Pacific name began operating in the southern United States. The new Chicago, Rock Island and Pacific Railroad LLC is primarily a shortline holding company, while also providing numerous other railroad services, such as switching, railroad management, railcar fleet management, railcar storage, and locomotive maintenance. The company acquired their first railroad in early 2019 with the acquisition of the Mississippi Delta Railroad. The company rosters eight locomotives. None of the locomotives or trackage belonged to the historic Rock Island.

== Company officers ==
Presidents of the Rock Island Railroad included:

- James W. Grant, November 27, 1850 – December 22, 1851.
- John Bloomfield Jervis, December 22, 1851 – December 1854.
- Henry Farnam, December 1854 – June 1863.
- Charles W. Durant, June 1863 – August 1866.
- John F. Tracy, August 1866 – April 14, 1877.
- Hugh Riddle, April 14, 1877 – June 6, 1883.
- Ransom Reed Cable, June 6, 1883 – June 1898.
- Warren G. Purdy, June 1898 – December 31, 1901.
- William Bateman Leeds, December 31, 1901 – March 26, 1904.
- Benjamin L. Winchell, March 26, 1904 – December 1909.
- Henry U. Mudge, December 1909 – April 20, 1915.
- Jacob McGavock Dickinson appointed receiver trustee during bankruptcy, April 20, 1915 – June 21, 1917.
- James E. Gorman, June 22, 1917 – June 7, 1933.
- Joseph B. Fleming, Frank Orren Lowden (until his death on March 20, 1943) and James E. Gorman (until his death on March 25, 1942) appointed receiver trustees during bankruptcy, June 7, 1933 – December 31, 1947. Aaron Colnon replaced Frank O. Lowden as receiver trustee on April 19, 1943.
- John Dow Farrington, January 1, 1948 – 1955.
- Downing B. Jenks, 1956–1961.
- R. Ellis Johnson, 1961–1964.
- Jervis Langdon, Jr., 1965–1970.
- William J. Dixon, 1970–1974.
- John W. Ingram, 1974 – January 1980.
- William M. Gibbons appointed receiver trustee during bankruptcy, March 17, 1975 – June 1, 1984.

== See also ==
- Chicago, Rock Island and Gulf Railway, its subsidiary extending to Galveston, Texas
- El Comedor
- Grand Excursion
- Iowa Interstate Railroad
- Joseph E. Sheffield
- LaSalle Street Station
- RailsWest Railroad Museum
- Rock Island Rockets
