= John W. Ingram =

American businessman

John W. Ingram (April 6, 1929 – January 27, 2008) was the President of the Chicago, Rock Island and Pacific Railroad in its final years, from 1974 to 1979.

== Career ==
Ingram was Federal Railroad Administration (FRA) Administrator from 1971 to 1974, and took over the Rock Island in 1974, and resigned in November 1979, only several months later on January 24, 1980, the Rock Island was ordered to be liquidated in federal bankruptcy court.

In 1974, Ingram wanted a new paint design for the Rock Island, this new paint, was blue, black and white (former colors had been red and yellow). In September 1979, the Rock Island clerks walked out on strike against the railroad. The Interstate Commerce Commission ordered the Kansas City Terminal Railway to take over operations, and Ingram resigned. At that point, William M. Gibbons, who was already the receiver and trustee of the railroad, took over as president.

The Rock Island was shut down in March 1980 after being bankrupt for several years.

Ingram began his railroad career during his college years in New York City as a brakeman or the New York Central Railroad (NYCRR). After graduation in 1951 he was hired as a research analyst in the Economic Analysis Office of the NYCRR. While there he was one of the founders of the Transportation Research Forum (TRF) along with Herbert Whitten of the Chesapeake and Ohio Railway (C&O). In about 1960 he joined the Marketing Department of the Southern Railway in Washington, DC. Soon he developed what became known as the "Big John" covered hopper car to transport bulk grain at low freight rated from the Midwest to poultry farms in the Southeast which led to fast growth of that industry and became the primary means of grain shipment by rail throughout the nation. In 1971 he joined the Federal Dept. of Transportation as FRA Administrator.

He was the older brother of Radio Hall of Fame member Dan Ingram.
