= Golden Spike (disambiguation) =

The golden spike is the ceremonial final spike which joined the rails of the First Transcontinental Railroad across the United States in 1869.

Golden Spike(s) or golden spike may also refer to:

== Arts and entertainment ==
- Golden Spike, the highest award at the Valladolid International Film Festival
- The Golden Spike, an album by Sky Larkin
- The Golden Spike, a novel by Hal Ellson

== Science ==
- Golden spike (geology), or GSSP, a reference point on a section of rock defining the lower boundary of a geological era
- Golden Spike Company, a former American space transport company

== Sports ==
- Golden Spike (Belgium), an annual athletics award in Belgium
- Golden Spike Ostrava, an annual athletics event held in Ostrava, Czech Republic
- The Golden Spike, a tradition for the Atlanta United soccer team in the United States
- Golden Spikes Award, an annual amateur baseball award in the United States

== Other uses ==
- The Golden Spike Award (rail), an annual award delivered by the Rail Passengers Association in the United States

== See also ==
- Gold Spike (disambiguation)
