= William M. Gibbons =

American lawyer

William M. Gibbons (October 26, 1919 – October 31, 1990) was a lawyer for 28 years, and would become the receiver and trustee of the Chicago, Rock Island and Pacific Railroad during Rock Island's third and final bankruptcy.

Gibbons was a lieutenant in the United States Navy during World War II. He was a graduate of Loyola University Chicago and Loyola University Chicago School of Law.

Gibbons worked for the law firm of Lord, Bissell & Brook of Chicago.

Gibbons was chosen receiver and trustee for Rock Island on March 17, 1975, the day Rock Island entered bankruptcy receivership. He and the Kansas City Terminal Railway held the power to oversee and liquidate the railroad. His last day as the receiver and trustee was June 1, 1984, after all of the Rock Island's locomotives, cars, tracks and trackage rights were sold, dismantled and sold, or abandoned under an Interstate Commerce Commission directed service order. Gibbons was able to raise $500 million in the liquidation, paying off all the railroad's creditors with interest.

At the time, the Rock Island Railroad liquidation was the largest railroad company liquidation in United States history.

Gibbons died October 31, 1990, in Gold River, California, at the age of 71. He was survived by his second wife, Jean; four daughters, 11 grandchildren, and a brother.

== See also ==
- Chicago, Rock Island and Pacific Railroad

Preceded by John W. Ingram	Receiver and Trustee of Chicago, Rock Island and Pacific Railroad; 1975 – 1984	company dissolved
