= Golden Spike Award (rail) =

Annual award from the US Rail Passengers Association

- Awarded for: Outstanding contributions to passenger rail in the United States
- Country: United States
- Presented by: Rail Passengers Association (formerly NARP)
- First award: mid-1960s
- Website: www.railpassengers.org/about/goals-vision/awards/golden-spike-award/

The Golden Spike Award (formally the 'George Falcon Golden Spike Award') is a recognition presented by the Rail Passengers Association to "honor work done to advance the cause of a robust national rail system in the U.S." Since the 1960s, the 60+ recipients have mostly been members of Congress, as well as celebrities, railroad workers, and advocates. The award is among the most prominent honours in the American passenger rail advocacy community.

== History ==
The award's name and physical form come from the ceremonial tradition of driving a Golden spike as the last spike when completing a railroad in the U.S.: for example, a golden spike was used to complete the First Transcontinental Railroad at Promontory Summit, Utah, on 10 May 1869.

The award was conceived in the mid-1960s by George Falcon, publisher of Key magazine, an entertainment and dining guide serving the Los Angeles and Orange County area. Falcon was inspired by actress Debbie Reynolds, an avid train enthusiast whose father had worked as a conductor on the Southern Pacific Railroad. Reynolds became the award's first recipient; Walt Disney was the second.

Falcon was an early and active member of the National Association of Railway Passengers (NARP), which was founded in 1967. As his involvement with the organisation deepened, the Golden Spike evolved from a personal initiative into an official NARP award. Originally the prize consisted solely of a golden spike; by the 1970s the presentation form had evolved into a golden spike mounted on a wooden plaque bearing a brass inscription plate.

Since 1984, the NARP (later Rail Passengers Association) Board of Directors Executive Committee has approved all recipients. Falcon continued to supply the physical awards and publicise recipients in Key magazine until his death in 2003, after which the award was formally renamed in his honour as the George Falcon Golden Spike Award.

== Recipients ==
The following is a list of known recipients, compiled from Rail Passengers Association records and from some industry/local news sources. A number of sources suggest that Senator Daniel Patrick Moynihan (D-NY) received the award at some point, but no official or contemporaneous record is available.

Year	Recipient	Notes	Ref
1967	Debbie Reynolds	Actress and train enthusiast; first recipient; inspired the creation of the award	
1968	Walt Disney	Animator and producer	
1974	Johnny Cash	Singer-songwriter	
1976	American Freedom Train	Presented in Anaheim, with AFT Foundation President Petr Spurney and Astronaut Edwin 'Buzz' Aldrin	
1976	Barron Hilton Sr.	Hotelier	
1983	City of Anaheim		
1985	Ross Capon	Train executive, and later President of the NARP	
1988	William Lehman	U.S. Representative (D-FL); chairman of the House Appropriations Sub-committee on Transportation for his "strong and longstanding support for Amtrak and transit."	
1988	Frank Lautenberg	U.S. Senator (D-NJ); first award (received a second award in 2000)	
1990	Paul Simon	U.S. Senator (D-IL); for helping to preserve Chicago-St. Louis, and supporting use of some federal gasoline tax funds for Amtrak	
1992	Al Swift	U.S. Representative (D-WA); for introducing H.R. 4414 and work on service between Portland, Seattle and Vancouver	
1993	George J. Mitchell	U.S. Senator (D-ME); for "strong support of rail passenger service generally and especially of construction of a rail link between Boston's North and South Stations and establishment of Amtrak service to Maine"	
1994	John A. Businger	Massachusetts State Representative (D-Brookline)	
1994	William F. Weld	Governor of Massachusetts	
1997	Kay Bailey Hutchison	U.S. Senator (R-TX); chair of the Subcomittee on Surface Transportation and Merchant Marine; fought for extension of Texas Eagle	
1999	Tommy G. Thompson	Amtrak Chairman and Wisconsin Governor	
2000	Frank Lautenberg	U.S. Senator (D-NJ); second award, first time any individual received the award twice	
2000	George Voinovich	U.S. Senator (R-OH)	
2001	Jack Martin	ex-president of the NARP	
2002	Ernest Hollings	U.S. Senator (D-SC); recognised as a leading advocate for intercity passenger rail and high-speed rail corridors	
2002	Jack Quinn	U.S. Representative (R-NY)	
2002	Doras Briggs	NARP board member; recognised for citizen advocacy and spearheading the California station host programme	
2003	Patty Murray	U.S. Senator (D-WA); recognised as Chairman of the Transportation Appropriations Subcommittee for preventing an Amtrak shutdown	
2003	C. W. Bill Young	U.S. Representative (R-FL); recognised as House Appropriations Chairman for preventing an Amtrak shutdown	
2004	Tom Carper	U.S. Senator (D-DL)	
2004	Sherwood Boehlert	U.S. Representative (R-NY)	
2005	Earl Blumenauer	U.S. Representative (D-OR); for his "support of light rail and pedestrian-friendly land use planning"	
2005	Arlen Specter	U.S. Senator (R-PA); for "his long service on the Senate Appropriations Committee"	
2005	James Oberstar	U.S. Representative (DFL-MN); for "staunch defense of Amtrak and the national network"	
2006	Trent Lott	U.S. Senator (R-MS); recognised as a defender of the national rail passenger network	
2006	Robert Byrd	U.S. Senator (D-WV); recognised for over three decades of advocacy for the national rail passenger network	
2006	Steve LaTourette	U.S. Representative (R-OH)	
2006	Corrine Brown	U.S. Representative (D-FL)	
2007	Richard Durbin	U.S. Senator (D-IL); recognised for expanding Amtrak service in Illinois	
2007	Denny Rehberg	U.S. Representative (R-MT); recognised for chairing the Congressional Rail Caucus and securing Amtrak funding	
2008	Gordon Smith	U.S. Senator (R-OR)	
2008	John Olver	U.S. Representative (D-MA); Chairman of the House Appropriations Subcommittee on Transportation	
2009	Harry Reid	U.S. Senator (D-NV); recognised for role in the 2008 Rail Safety/Amtrak reauthorisation and inclusion of passenger trains in the American Recovery and Reinvestment Act	
2009	John Mica	U.S. Representative (R-FL); recognised for support of high-speed rail and as a leader on the House Transportation and Infrastructure Committee	
2011	Olympia Snowe and Susan Collins	U.S. Senators (R-ME); recognised for support of the Amtrak Downeaster	
2011	Louise Slaughter	U.S. Representative (D-NY); recognised for founding the Bicameral High Speed and Intercity Rail Caucus	
2012	Daniel Inouye	U.S. Senator (D-HI); recognised as Chairman of the Senate Committee on Commerce, Science and Transportation for passage of the Passenger Rail Investment and Improvement Act (PRIIA) of 2008	
2012	Patrick Meehan	U.S. Representative (R-PA)	
2013	Mark Kirk	U.S. Senator (R-IL); recognised for support of public-private partnerships in rail infrastructure	
2013	Peter DeFazio	U.S. Representative (D-OR); recognised for 25 years of advocacy for passenger trains in the Pacific Northwest	
2014	Kevin Cramer	U.S. Representative (R-ND); recognised for highlighting freight congestion delays to the Empire Builder	
2015	Joseph Szabo	Administrator of the Federal Railroad Administration, 2009–2014; fifth-generation railroader and first union member to lead the FRA	
2016	John Thune	U.S. Senator (R-SD); recognised for leadership on the FAST Act	
2016	Roger Wicker	U.S. Senator (R-MS); recognised for drafting the rail title of the FAST Act	
2017	Patrick Leahy	U.S. Senator (D-VT)	
2017	Ann Kuster	U.S. Representative (D-NH)	
2017	Elise Stefanik	U.S. Representative (R-NY)	
2018	James Hamre	Rail passenger advocate and vice president of All Aboard Washington; awarded posthumously following his death in the 2017 Amtrak derailment near DuPont, Washington	
2019	Jerry Moran	U.S. Senator (R-KS); recognised for protecting long-distance Southwest Chief service	
2019	Pat Roberts	U.S. Senator (R-KS)	
2019	Michael Bennet	U.S. Senator (D-CO)	
2019	Cory Gardner	U.S. Senator (R-CO)	
2019	Martin Heinrich	U.S. Senator (D-NM)	
2019	Tom Udall	U.S. Senator (D-NM)	
2020	Dan Lipinski	U.S. Representative (D-IL) -- for work to "better relationships between railroads and the communities they serve"	
2021	Frontline Amtrak Employees	Awarded collectively to six rail unions — BLET, TCU/IAM, TCU-ARASA, SMART-TD, TWU, and Unite Here — for maintaining essential services during the COVID-19 pandemic	
2022	Peter DeFazio	U.S. Representative (D-OR); second award, recognised as Chair of the House Committee on Transportation and Infrastructure for advancing passenger rail legislation	
2023	Steve Cohen	U.S. Representative (D-TN); recognised for defending the rights of coach passengers and rolling back Amtrak service cuts	

== Relationship to other Rail Passengers Association awards ==
The Golden Spike Award is the oldest and most prominent of several awards presented by the Rail Passengers Association. Other awards include:

- John R. Martin Passenger Train Advocacy Award – named after a late president of NARP, given at the discretion of the Chairman and President to individuals who have provided many years of exceptional service to rail travellers.
- Youth Passenger Citizenship Award – presented on occasion to students and young people demonstrating exceptional leadership or passion in improving the passenger train experience.
- Tracks to the Future Leadership Award
- NARP Academic Award – established in 2011, given annually to university and college professors with a distinguished record in advancing knowledge of passenger rail in the United States and Canada.
- Dr. Gary Burch Memorial Safety Award – given annually to a railroad worker who has done the most to improve the safety of railroad passengers; awarded in memory of Dr. Gary Burch, one of eight passengers killed when Amtrak's Silver Star derailed in 1991.

== See also ==
- Rail Passengers Association
- Railroader of the Year
- History of rail transport in the United States
