= The Hoover Company =

American home appliance company

Coordinates: 41.3674425°N 81.4678404°W

- Type: Subsidiary
- Industry: Floor care
- Genre: Home appliances
- Founded: June 2, 1908; 118 years ago
- Founder: William Henry Hoover
- Headquarters: Charlotte, North Carolina, US
- Area served: Global
- Products: Vacuum cleaners; deep cleaners; hard-floor cleaners; stick vacs; laundry products; cooling products
- Parent: Candy Haier (Europe); Techtronic Industries (North America)
- Website: www.hoover.com

The Hoover Company is a home appliance company founded in Ohio, United States, in 1908. It also established a major base in the United Kingdom, where it dominated the electric vacuum cleaner industry during most of the 20th century, to the point where the Hoover brand name became synonymous with vacuum cleaners and vacuuming in the United Kingdom and Ireland. Hoover North America was once part of Maytag, but was sold by Maytag's new owners Whirlpool Corporation in 2007 to Hong Kong multinational manufacturing company Techtronic Industries for $107 million. Hoover International had already split from Hoover North America in 1993, and was acquired by Candy in 1995, which was acquired by Haier in 2018.

In addition to producing floorcare products, Hoover was a prominent domestic appliance brand in Europe, particularly well known for its washing machines and tumble dryers in the United Kingdom and Ireland, and it also achieved significant sales across many other European markets. Today, the Hoover Europe brand, part of the portfolio owned by the Chinese multinational home appliance company Haier, remains a major player in the European white goods and floorcare sectors in several countries.

== History ==
The first upright vacuum cleaner was invented in June 1908 in North Canton, Ohio, by department store janitor and occasional inventor James Murray Spangler. Spangler was an asthmatic, and suspecting the carpet sweeper he was using at work was the cause of his ailment, he created a basic suction-sweeper by mounting an electric fan motor on a carpet sweeper and then adding a soap box and a broom handle. After refining the design and obtaining a patent for the Electric Suction Sweeper he set about producing it himself, assisted by his son, who helped him assemble the machines, and his daughter, who assembled the dust bags. Production was slow, completing just two to three machines a week.

Spangler soon gave one of his Electric Suction Sweepers to his cousin Susan Troxel Hoover, who used it at home. Impressed with the machine, she told her husband and son about it. William Henry "Boss" Hoover and son Herbert William Hoover Sr. were leather goods manufacturers in North Canton, Ohio, which at the time was called New Berlin. Hoover bought the patent from Spangler later that same year, founding the Electric Suction Sweeper Company for an initial capital investment of $36,000 ($1,290,000 today), retaining Spangler as production supervisor with pay based on royalties in the new business. Spangler continued to contribute to the company, patenting numerous further Suction Sweeper designs until his death in 1915, when the company name was changed to the Hoover Suction Sweeper Company, with Spangler's family continuing to receive royalties from his original patent until 1925.

== Henry Dreyfuss and Hoover ==
Henry Dreyfuss

Patent for Dreyfuss' 150 design

In the early 1930s, the company retained the services of Henry Dreyfuss, an up-and-coming industrial designer, to give the Hoover lineup a much needed update. Before Dreyfuss's involvement with the company, the majority of the machines manufactured consisted of a black motor and an aluminum base; this was the norm for more than twenty years. When Hoover introduced the 'Hedlite' in 1932, it was rather awkward and unattractive.

Dreyfuss made the machine more aesthetically pleasing and echoed the trends of streamlined design. In 1935, he was commissioned to completely redesign the Hoover cleaner. In 1936, for a fee of US$25,000, Dreyfuss sold Hoover the design which would become the Model 150 cleaner. For the first time since the introduction of the Hoover vacuum cleaner, the mechanical workings were completely concealed from sight by a Bakelite cover. This cover was a tear-drop styled shell, which seamlessly incorporated the headlight. Also, he totally revamped the base of the machine. Since the release of this design, all Hoover cleaners consisted of a fluid base and a hood to cover the electric motor. These designs suggested efficiency, cleanliness, and speed. His final design for the Hoover Company was the 1957 Convertible.

== Development ==
Faced with a total lack of interest by the public in his expensive and unfamiliar new gadget, Hoover placed an ad in The Saturday Evening Post offering customers ten days' free use of his vacuum cleaner to anyone who requested it. Using a network of local retailers to facilitate the offer, Hoover thus developed a national network of retailers for the vacuums. By the end of 1908, the company had sold 372 Model 0s. By 1912, sales had been made to Norway, France, Russia, Belgium, Holland and Scotland.

In 1919, Gerald Page-Wood – an art director of Erwin, Wasey & Company, Hoover's advertising agency – came up with a succinct slogan which summed up the Hoover's cleaning action: 'It Beats...as it Sweeps...as it Cleans'. At this time, it referred to the action of the revolving brushes, which vibrated the carpet and helped loosen the trodden-in grit. This offered an advantage over competitors' machines, which used suction alone to remove dirt, and therefore were not as efficient as the Hoover. Seven years later, the famous slogan would adapt to even more significance.

Hoover's business began to flourish, and, a year after Hoover acquired the patent from Spangler, he established a research and development department for his new business. By 1926, Hoover had developed the 'beater bar' - a metal bar attached to the rotating brush roll, situated in the floor nozzle cavity of the upright vacuum cleaner. Introduced on Models 543 and 700, the beater bars alternated with the sweeping brushes to vibrate the carpet while sucking. It provided a more distinct 'tap' than the bristle tufts used on the former machines, and led to a 101% increase in efficiency. This cleaning action was marketed by Hoover as "Positive Agitation". 'It Beats...as it Sweeps...as it Cleans' rang more true now than ever.

The Model 200 Duster and Model 575 upright, which used the same motor

In 1929, Hoover introduced the Model 200 Duster. This would be their first attempt at a cylinder cleaner. It used a Model 575 motor with a modified suction impeller, which was mounted on a unique aluminum body with runners, allowing the cleaner to be pulled behind the user. The Duster was produced for only three months and roughly 9,000 were made.

Herbert W. Hoover Sr. took over as president of the company in 1922 and as chairman of the board of the Hoover Company in 1932. 1930 saw the introduction of the world's first handheld vacuum cleaner, the Hoover Dustette. The good design and exceptional durability of these machines mean many are still in service today, some at over 80 years old.

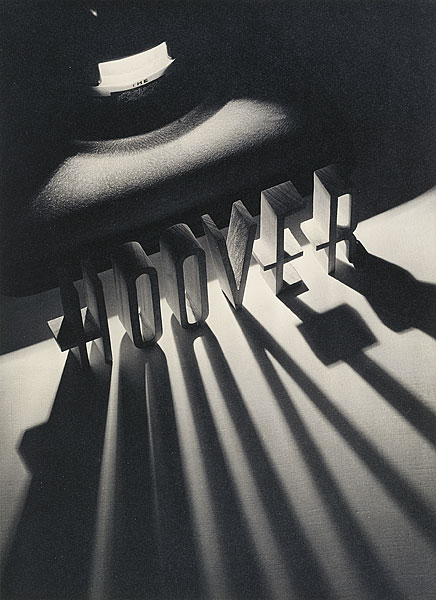
1937 Hoover ad by Australian photographer Max Dupain, showing the headlamp

In 1932, Hoover introduced a new optional headlamp called the Hoover Hedlite on Models 425, 750 and 900. By March 1932, it had become standard equipment on Models 750 and 900, and a $5 extra-cost option on Model 425. The Hoover Hedlite illuminated the floor ahead of the cleaner, useful for dimly-lit rooms and corridors, and under furniture. Several new slogans mentioned the light, including 'It shows you the dirt you never knew you had!', and 'It lights where it's going...it's clean where it's gone!'.

In 1936, Hoover introduced the top-of-the-line Model 150. It had a time to empty bag indicator; automatic height adjustment; a magnesium body, which made it weigh less than previous models; instant tool conversion; and a two-speed motor. One of the first Dreyfuss designs for Hoover, it was the symbol of the machine age; the Bakelite hood hid the entire motor from view and there were no protruding knobs or gadgets. It was the first Hoover cleaner that was not of the traditional "coffee can" style, which Hoover had been using since its earliest years. The cleaner sold from 1936 to 1939 and was priced at $80 ($1,852 today). Two other lower-priced Hoovers sold along with the 150: the Model 25 (1937–38), which was the middle-of-the-line cleaner priced at $65 ($1,456 today), and the Model 300 (1935–38), which became the bottom-of-the-line cleaner and sold at $49.75 ($1,154). Due to the backdrop of the Great Depression, Hoover produced only 166,000 150s in its three-year production run.

From 1941 to 1945, Hoover ceased all vacuum cleaner production and converted the North Canton, Ohio factory to support the war effort. When World War II ended in 1945, Hoover started producing cleaners again and unveiled the Model 27 for post-war America to enjoy.

In 1950, Hoover introduced the Veriflex, which was the first rubberized suction hose in the industry. Other cleaners at the time were using cloth-braided hoses, which would deteriorate and lose suction over time. In 1954, Herbert W. Hoover Jr. took over the presidency of the company from his father. A nephew of the founder, H. Earl Hoover, also served as chairman and honorary director.

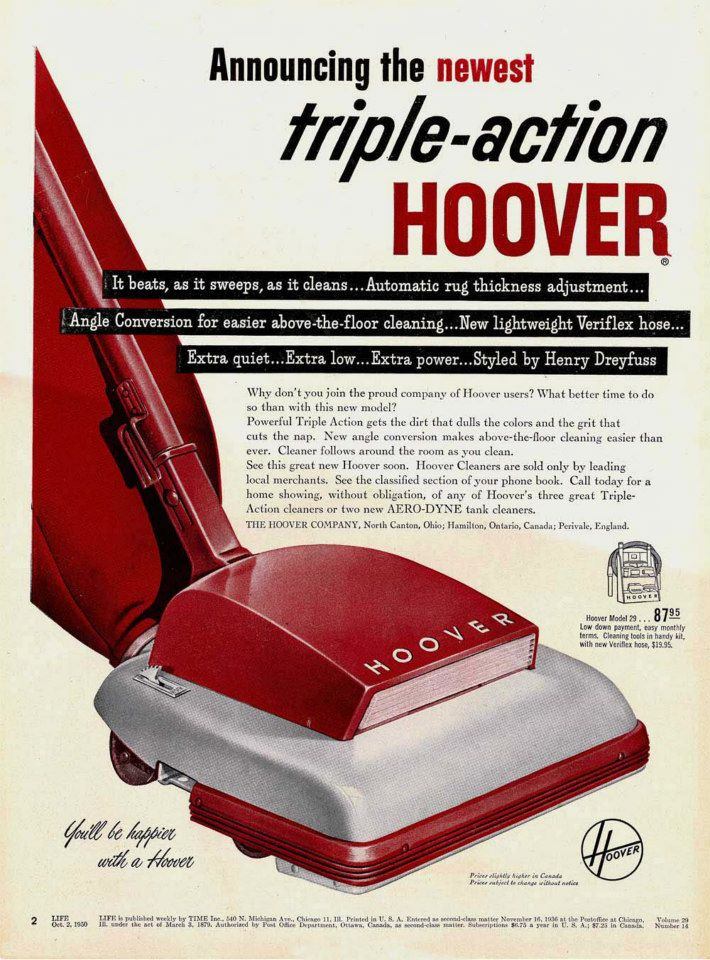
Debut ad for the Hoover Model 29, the first Hoover cleaner made in red

The sombre and restrained colors of the previous decades gave way to bright, striking modern color-schemes, starting with the Hoover Model 29 in 1950, which was red instead of the regular black and brown colors of the past. This was part of their policy of the continual development and modernization of their output.

In 1957, Hoover introduced the Convertible Model 65 (the De Luxe 652 in the UK). It was the last machine designed by Henry Dreyfuss, the industrial designer who had worked with the company since the early 1930s. This cleaner introduced what Hoover called 'Automatic Shift', a system whereby the tool converter plugged into the rear of the cleaner. This was not a new idea: instant tool conversion had been introduced in 1936 with the Model 150 Cleaning Ensemble. However, new to Model 65, and slightly later in Britain on the 652A, was the introduction of a switch which automatically shifted the motor to a higher speed as the converter was inserted. The Convertible, or the Senior, in Britain, remains Hoover's worldwide bestselling cleaner. Although the domestic line was finally discontinued in 1993, a version called the Guardsman is still available in the commercial sector.

1963 saw the introduction of the Dial-A-Matic in the US – sold in Australia as the Dynamatic, and in Britain as the Convertible. This was the first-ever clean-air upright cleaner. The clean-air principle is similar to the flow of air through a cylinder/canister cleaner. Rather than the dirt passing directly through the suction fan and being blown into the bag, it passes through the bag first, leaving only clean air to pass through the fan. This principle was soon adopted by many manufacturers and continues to be used today. Also, the machine was constructed out of hard plastic. Hoover produced this cleaner from 1963 until the late 1970s in America.

In the summer of 1969, Hoover further refined the Dial-A-Matic's design when they launched the 'Powerdrive' self-propulsion system on the Hoover model 1170. This idea took much of the effort out of pushing the cleaner, because, by using a system of gears, wheels, and belts, the cleaner used its own power to drive itself forward and backwards, the speed and direction being controlled entirely by the user though the 'Triple-Action' handgrip. The powerdrive feature on the model 1170 was so efficient, the user could push the bulky machine forward with one finger, and the feature could also be disengaged with a button on the handgrip so the machine could travel easily from room to room with the motor turned off, the machine was very difficult to push when the motor was turned off and the powerdrive was still activated. This was also the first vacuum cleaner available commercially that used the self-propulsion system. This extra technology made the Dial-A-Matic even heavier than the original and more expensive, at around $150 ($1,317 today). The 'Powerdrive' system was carried over into the Concept range in 1978. The powerdrive system was later renamed "Self Propelled". Hoover continued to use this feature on many products of the 1980s and 1990s. It is still being used today by Hoover and numerous other companies.

In 1986, the Hoover family sold the company to the Chicago Pacific Corporation, which was created using the remnants of the bankrupt Rock Island Railroad. It was acquired by Maytag Corporation in 1989.

On Friday, 6 March 2009, Hoover confirmed that it would discontinue production of washing machines and other laundry products at its Merthyr Tydfil factory, Mid Glamorgan from Saturday, 14 March 2009; giving the reason, the company stated that it could no longer manufacture competitively priced laundry products at the plant.

Hoover had initially announced its closure intentions on Tuesday, 18 November 2008, beginning a period of staff consultation. The company was established in the town just over sixty years prior, its factory at Pentrebach, Merthyr Tydfil, opening on 12 October 1948.

Though 337 jobs were lost because of this decision, Hoover UK anticipated retaining its headquarters, logistics, storage and after sales service functions at the site, with some 113 workers retained. In 2019, Hoover opened a new head office in Warrington, Cheshire. It retained a distribution centre at Pentrebach. Hoover are the current shirt sponsor for Rugby League club Warrington Wolves.

=== Popular Hoover machines ===
The Junior
Introduced by Hoover Limited (UK) in the 1930s, the Hoover Junior is a smaller upright type vacuum for apartments or small houses which was easy to carry around. The Junior was very popular in the UK; Hoover sold millions of them, and it became the biggest selling vacuum there. Various models were produced, with the final machine being manufactured in 1987. Hoover Limited made Juniors for export to the US from the mid-1960s to the late 1970s. The exported Juniors were converted to American electrical standards by The Hoover Company in North Canton, Ohio. Finding a Hoover Junior in the USA is quite rare. The Junior was never referred to as such in the USA; it was tagged in official Hoover literature as the Lightweight Upright.
The Dirtsearcher
Introduced again by Hoover Limited (UK) in 1969, was a development of the Junior with a Model 638 style headlamp fitted in place of the tool adapter cover at the front. This model the 1354 went on to be the most successful UK Hoover manufactured model selling in both European and Commonwealth markets, however it was never sold in the US, although there were 110 V versions of the UK-market Juniors sold in Canada (such as the 1354A). They were sold alongside the Junior and Senior/Ranger models becoming the now rare models U1016 and U1040.
The Portable
The Hoover Portable was launched by Hoover in 1963. It is a "Suitcase" type canister that did not have wheels; it would tugged around with by the user. When finished, the hose, attachments, and power cord would be stored inside the machine. In 1969, Hoover added wheels to the Portable. The Portable was manufactured until 1978. Also, it used the same motor as the Hoover Dial-A-Matic, the first clean-air upright.
The Constellation
In 1954, Hoover introduced the Model 82 Constellation. It was a radically new design in cylinder and tank cleaners. Designed by Henry Dreyfuss, it represented America's obsession with the space race. Its spherical shape resembled the planet Saturn and impersonated developing space technology. Its most memorable attribute was the ability to "walk on air", which eliminated the need for casters, wheels or runners. The cleaner was made mobile by directing its exhaust air down toward the floor, which caused the cleaner to rise enough from the floor to hover and float behind the user (starting with the Model 84). This was an engineering marvel in and of itself. The Constellation cleaner remained extremely popular in its close to 25-year run, with minor design modifications. The machine was discontinued in the mid-1970s with the introduction of the Hoover Celebrity; however, the Constellation was still produced in the UK well into the 1980s. The machine was so fondly remembered that it was reintroduced and sold from 2006 to 2009.
Model 28
Introduced in 1946, Hoover produced over two million of this model for post-war America. It sold from 1946 to 1950.
Model 63
In 1953, Hoover debuted the 'deluxe' Model 63 for $116.95 ($1,407 today). It was the first Hoover to utilize a full wrap around bumper and a completely disposable dust bag. The cleaner was styled in two-tone baby blue (base) and navy blue (everything except the base). It was an extremely popular model and sold over four million units. The machine was produced from 1953 to 1956. It was sold, in smaller numbers, in the UK, as the model 638. Again, this machine was designed by Henry Dreyfuss.
Hoovermatic
A long-running line of top-loading twin-tub washing machines which ran from 1948 until 1993, sold mainly in Europe, Australia and New Zealand. Hoovermatics were also sold in North America under the Washdog name. The machines used a unique washing action which made use of an impeller (known as a "Pulsator"), situated on the side of the wash tub, which revolved at high speed to create a moving current of water in the wash tub that dragged the laundry through the water.
The Convertible
1957 ushered in the "long, low and rarin' to go" Convertible. The name derives from the cleaner's ability to 'automatically shift' into a higher speed upon insertion of the tool converter for more powerful above the floor cleaning. Beginning with the Model 65, it soon became one of the most popular and well known cleaners in American history. The Convertible line was in production from 1957 to the early 1990s, and is still sold in variations in the commercial sector. The "Convertible" was also widely sold in the UK under the name "Senior": the Senior Cleaners were viewed to be the model for larger homes, and although it never outsold the Junior in Britain, it was still a massively popular cleaner.

=== Current products ===
The products sold under the Hoover brand vary increasingly from one market to the next. For example, in the United States, the Hoover brand is used exclusively to sell floorcare products produced by TTI. Meanwhile, in the UK and most of Europe, Hoover branding appears on Candy Group products including white goods such as washing machines, dishwashers, and refrigerators, as well as floorcare products. Current details of the product range available to consumers can be found by visiting the Hoover website for the market of interest.

== The word "hoover" ==
In the UK and Ireland the word "hoover" has long been colloquially synonymous with "vacuum cleaner" and the verb "to vacuum" (e.g. "you were hoovering the carpet"), since the Hoover Company's dominance there during the early 20th century. Despite Hoover no longer being the top seller of vacuum cleaners in the UK, the term "hoover" has remained as a genericized trademark.

== The Hoover Historical Center ==
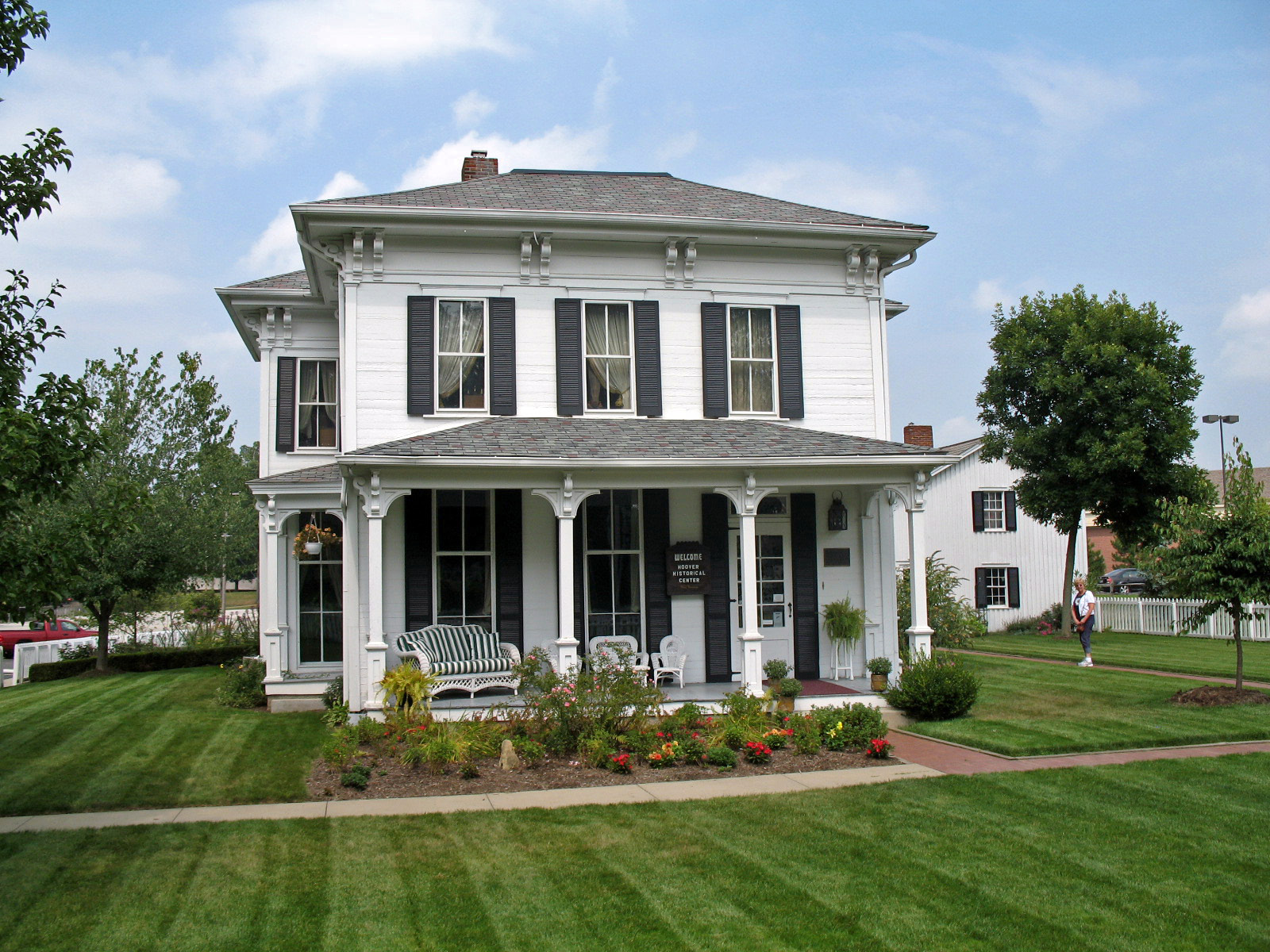
Boyhood home (built 1853) of Hoover Company founder, William "Boss" Hoover: now the Hoover Historical Center

In 1978, the Hoover Company opened a museum in the old Hoover home in North Canton, Ohio on the campus of Walsh University. It is called The Hoover Historical Center, and is dedicated to the history of the Hoover company in Canton. The museum exhibits include a number of non-Hoover hand-operated vacuum cleaners from before the company started, and displays of Hoover products throughout the company's history. Also on display are some of the munitions the company produced during World War II to help the war effort, and Hoover family personal items.

== Ownership transitions ==
The Hoover plant in North Canton, Ohio.

The company became publicly traded in the 1940s. Stock in Hoover was first sold on August 6, 1943, allowing the company to expand. In 1985, Hoover was purchased by the Chicago Pacific Corporation, and in 1989, Chicago Pacific was purchased by Maytag.

In 1993, the Hoover Trading Company and Hoover UK merged to become the Hoover European Appliances Group. In 1995, Candy Group acquired the Hoover European Appliances Group in its entirety with the exclusive rights on the brand for the whole of Europe (including all territories of the former-Soviet Union), North Africa and selected countries in the Middle East.

In 2004, Maytag announced that it would consolidate its corporate office and back-office operations in Newton, Iowa, and close almost all of Hoover's overlapping functions. This effectively meant that most white-collar jobs at Hoover's North Canton location would be eliminated. The company had previously closed another manufacturing facility in Jackson Township, Stark County, Ohio, and the facility was sold to a church. Like many manufacturing companies in the United States, Hoover is experiencing pressures as consumers demand lower-priced goods. Hoover has operations in Mexico, where operating costs are lower than in the United States.

After Maytag was acquired by Whirlpool in 2006, that firm reached an agreement to sell Hoover to Hong Kong–based firm Techtronic Industries. TTI announced its intention to close the original plant in North Canton in September 2007.

== Hoover in Australia ==
Since 1954, the Hoover factory at Meadowbank had manufactured washing machines and other products. A subsidiary of the US company, Hoover Australia merged with Chicago Pacific in 1985 and Maytag in 1989. Hoover Australia had its own administration, sales and marketing, large maintenance and engineering departments, a service division, and a much larger production workforce. At that time, in the early 1990s, Hoover was making healthy profits, as a result of investment in new technology and machinery through the late 1980s, a big drive towards quality improvement, and a very flexible workforce.

In 1994, Hoover Australia was to be listed as a public company with a six-monthly operating profit of $8,850,000. That sparked a fight between Email Limited and Southcorp, two of Australia's largest white goods manufacturers for a commercial sale. Both companies were eager to strengthen their market share and further monopolize the whitegoods industry. In December 1994, Southcorp announced that it had bought Hoover Australia. In March 1996, Southcorp began a big rationalization, sacking workers at the Hoover factory involved in maintenance, stores, administration and supervision. Also in the year up to March 1996, there had been a large increase in Southcorp's share price.

In April, 1999, Southcorp Appliances, including Hoover, Dishlex and Chef, was sold, meaning that Email had obtained a conservative 60 percent share of the Australian whitegoods market.

After the Southcorp takeover, a culture of fear was introduced, based on a concerted campaign to strip all the indirect labor from the workforce, and a myth that the factory was inefficient and unproductive. Every month it was reported the factory was losing $1 million or more. Morale at the factory went into a downward spiral. That was followed by decisions to stop production of barrel and upright vacuum cleaners, followed by front-loading washing machines. They were replaced with imported products. Plastic molding production was contracted out. The factory was being stripped of production, volume and jobs. A cost reduction campaign followed with good-quality components being replaced by inferior cheap components, and there was a complete breakdown of any real preventive maintenance program, which resulted in a large number of machine and equipment breakdowns. The reality, rather than the myth, was the Hoover Meadowbank site was being run into the ground by corporate decisions.

In the late 1990s, Email closed the Meadowbank factory and integrated its whitegoods manufacturing into the Simpson plant in South Australia. The vacuum cleaner side of the business was sold to Godfreys. Several years later, Email itself was sold and broken up, and the whitegoods division of Email was sold to Electrolux in February 2001. Shortly after taking ownership, Electrolux ceased leasing the Hoover brand name, and the manufacturing and supply of Hoover white goods ceased in Australia..

As of 2019, Hoover whitegoods are now being sold throughout Australia through several retailers.

== Free flights promotion ==
In 1992, the British division of Hoover announced the Hoover free flights promotion, the demand for which rose far beyond the company's expectations, resulting in major costs and public relations problems for the British division and Maytag, which eventually led to its sale to the Italian manufacturer Candy. In 1993, legal action was started in the United Kingdom to take Hoover to court over the promotion, and was successful in Hoover v. Sandy Jack at the sheriff court in Kirkcaldy, Fife. Hoover Holiday Pressure Group furthered court action against Hoover at St Helens in Merseyside.

== Competition ==
In 2000, US company Hoover was found guilty of patent infringement, as they used Dyson's Dual Cyclone in their Vortex vacuum—except they added one more Cyclone, calling it a Triple Vortex Cyclone As a result, Hoover lost its dominant position in the UK and in the United States, and now faces strong competition from numerous brands.

In the United States, Hoover's competition includes: Royal, Dirt Devil, Oreck, and Vax (all of which are owned by Hoover's Hong Kong owner Techtronic Industries); Kirby; Rexair; Eureka; Dyson; Electrolux; Panasonic; Bissell; and Kenmore (the house brand of American store chain Sears, which is manufactured predominantly by Panasonic and Sanyo).

Dyson and Electrolux lead the list of UK competitors, followed by Bosch, Dirt Devil, SEBO, Vax, Morphy Richards, Miele, Bissell, Numatic (maker of the famous "Henry" cylinder cleaner), Zanussi, Russell Hobbs, LG, and others.

== See also ==
- Hoover Canton plant, a vacuum cleaner manufacturing plant in Canton, Ohio
- Hoover Building, 1930s art deco factory and offices in Greater London
- Raymond Loewy
