= Gold Spike =

Gold Spike can refer to:

- Gold Spike (property)
- The Golden spike that was used to commemorate the completion of the First transcontinental railroad

== See also ==
- Golden Spike (disambiguation)
