= James M. Spangler =

American inventor (1848–1915)

James Murray Spangler
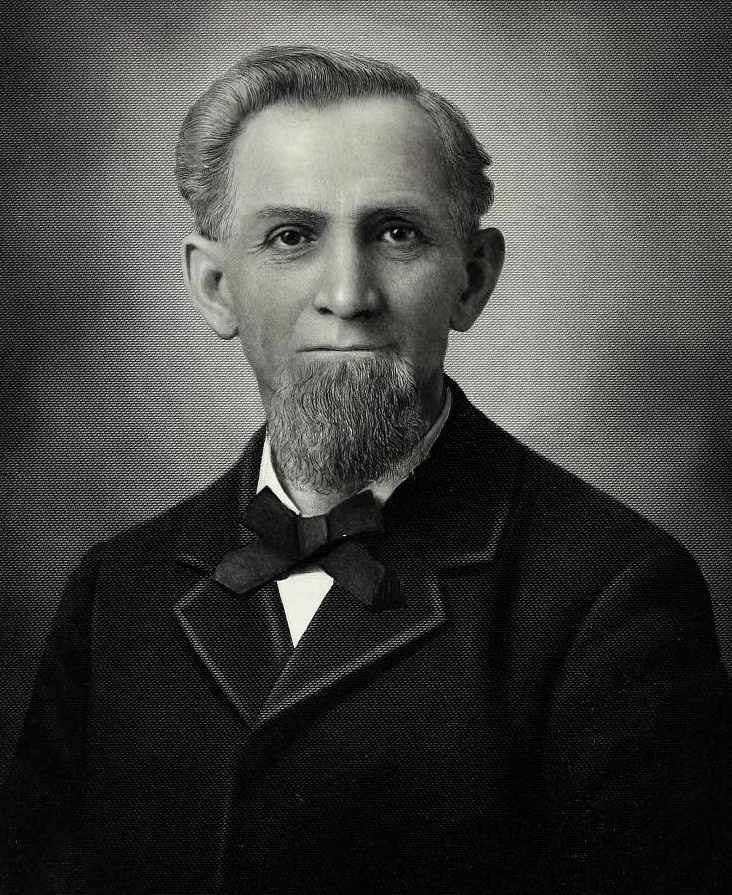
- Spangler in a 1916 publication
- Born: November 20, 1848; Plain Township, Stark County, Ohio, U.S.
- Died: January 23, 1915 (aged 66); Chicago, Illinois, U.S.
- Resting place: West Lawn Cemetery; Canton, Ohio, U.S.
- Occupations: Inventor, salesman, janitor
- Known for: Invention of the portable electric vacuum cleaner
- Spouse: Elesta Holtz
- Children: 3
- Awards: National Inventors Hall of Fame (2006)

Signature
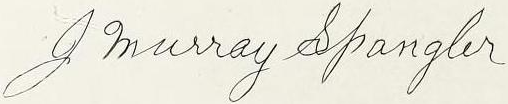

James Murray Spangler (November 20, 1848 – January 23, 1915) was an American inventor, salesman, and janitor who invented the first commercially successful portable electric vacuum cleaner that revolutionized household carpet cleaning. His device was not the first vacuum cleaner, but it was the first that was practical for home use. It was the first to use both a cloth filter bag and cleaning attachments. Spangler improved this basic model and received a patent for it in 1908. He formed the Electric Suction Sweeper Company to manufacture his device. William H. Hoover was so impressed with the vacuum cleaner that he bought into Spangler's business and patents.

== Early and family life ==
James Murray Spangler was born on November 20, 1848, at the Spangler homestead in Plain Township, Stark County, Ohio, to Elizabeth (née Lind) and William A. Spangler. His father was a farmer.

On May 21, 1874, Spangler married Elesta Holtz, daughter of M. J. Holtz, of Plain Township. They had three children, Clarence T., Frank G. and Jennie M. In 1880 they moved to Akron.

== Careers ==
Spangler engaged in agricultural pursuits for his early career and then worked in threshing in Plain Township.

After moving to Akron, Spangler was in business with his brother selling gent's furnishings. He also worked for the Aultman Company as a salesman.

Spangler was granted a patent on a grain harvester in 1887. He invented certain new and useful improvements such as the sliding tailboard made of sheet metal. He removed a standard tailboard and provided the sliding tailboard to regulate the width of the platform and adjust it to grain of different length. He also installed guards that prevented straw from wrapping around the roller. Spangler invented a combined hay rake and tedder which was patented in 1893. By his peculiar arrangement, he was able to provide a combined hay rake and tedder in one machine, thereby reducing the cost. He formed a company for its sale which was unsuccessful and short-lived.

In 1897 he was granted a patent for a velocipede wagon and sold his invention to a company in Springfield, Ohio. He claimed as new "the combination of the body or box, mounted upon traveling wheels". The bicycle became quite popular at the same time and interfered with the sale of the wagon.

== Invention of the portable electric vacuum cleaner ==
Spangler was an asthmatic. He worked as a janitor at Zollinger's Dry Goods Store in Canton, Ohio. He was looking for a way to reduce the dust in his workplace that aggravated his asthma. He suspected that the carpet sweeper he used on the job was the source of his cough. A tinkerer at heart, he set his mind to making an electric carpet sweeper.

While watching a rotary street sweeper in operation, Spangler got the idea to mount the motor from a ceiling fan onto a carpet sweeper and cut a hole in the back of the sweeper to attach fan blades which would blow dirt out of the rear of the cleaner into an attached dirt bag (a pillow case he borrowed from the store). He attached a leather belt from the motor shaft to the wood cylinder brush roll and a broom stick provided the handle. In his next attempt he used a wooden soap box as the main body. He used his invention successfully in cleaning the Follwell Building. Bringing his ingenuity to bear on the problem, Spangler fashioned a tin box, a pillowcase, an electric fan, and a broom handle into something we might recognize today as a crude vacuum cleaner. Spangler called it a "suction sweeper."

Despite being primitive and unwieldy, it worked—Spangler's asthma abated, and he received a patent for his troubles. He also realized that he might finally have a saleable invention. Spangler first tested his invention in 1907. During the next year, he refined the vacuum numerous times, and on June 2, 1908, he received a patent for his sweeper. He refined the patent several times from 1909 to 1913.

Spangler, with US$5,000 invested by a friend, formed the Electric Suction Sweeper Company. Ray Harned, nephew and financial representative of F. G. and W. H. Follwell, formed a partnership with Spangler in the fall of 1907. The Follwells had financed Zollingers and were financing Spangler who had filed an application for a patent in September 1907. In the fall and early winter of 1907, they began manufacturing the suction sweeper. However, in just a few months, finances were gone. Spangler didn't have the capital to mass-produce his gadget. So he showed the suction sweeper to his cousin Susan Hoover, who tried it, liked it, and extolled its virtues to her husband, William Henry Hoover, a leather-goods manufacturer. In August 1908, he dissolved his partnership with the Follwells and formed the Hoover Suction Sweeper Company. In its first year, they built a plant in Canton and afterward moved to New Berlin.

The timing was fortuitous. With the automobile gaining popularity, William Hoover was concerned about the market for his horse collars and harnesses, and was eager to diversify. In 1908 he bought Spangler's patent, and he soon had a small staff toiling in the corner of his leather shop, turning out six suction sweepers a day. William Hoover made further improvements to the vacuum cleaner that resembled a bagpipe attached to a cake box, a novel look that was very functional. Sluggish sales of the Hoover vacuum cleaner were given a kick by Hoover’s ten-day, free home trial. Hoover came up with the idea of door-to-door salesmen who gave home demonstrations of the new vacuum cleaners. Hoover's success means that most people today associate the vacuum cleaner with him, rather than with Spangler.

== Later years ==
After Spangler sold the patents to William Hoover, he stayed on with the Hoover Company as the superintendent. Spangler's wife and daughter (Jennie Spangler Painter) made all the bags for the sweepers until 1914 when the bag making was taken to New Berlin. His son, Clarence, worked for about a year with The Electric Suction Sweeper Co. in New Berlin.

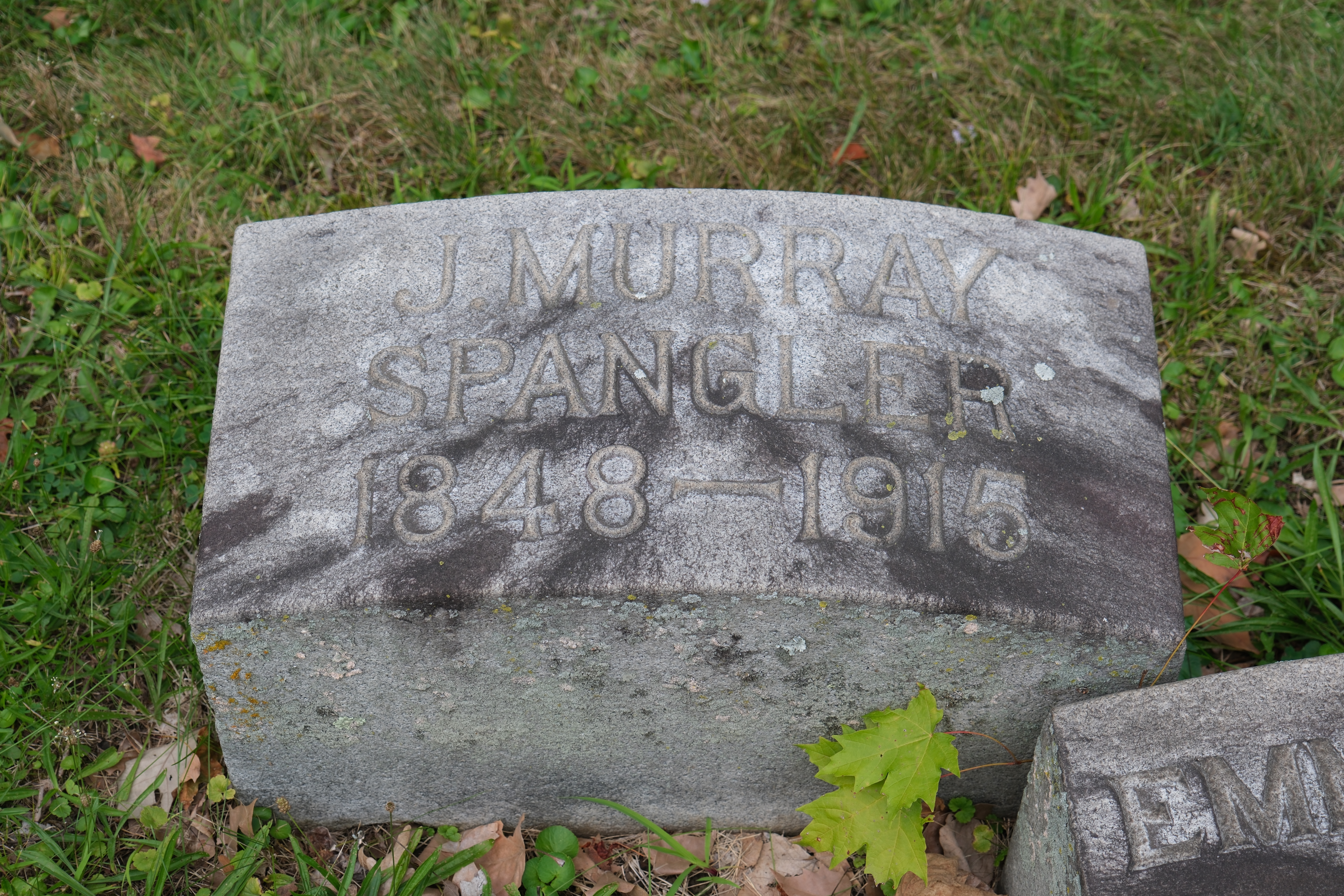
Grave of Spangler in West Lawn Cemetery

Spangler lived on 12th Street NW in Canton. He died on January 23, 1915. Spangler's family continued to receive royalties until his patent expired on June 2, 1925.

== Patents ==
- Spangler, U.S. patent 356,171, "Grain Harvester"
- Spangler, U.S. patent 492,341, "Combined Hay Rake and Tedder"
- Spangler, U.S. patent 576,746, "Velocipede Wagon"
- Spangler, U.S. patent 889,823, "Carpet Sweeper and Cleaner"
- Spangler, U.S. patent 1,073,301, "Suction Carpet Sweeper"

== See also ==
- Vacuum cleaner
- The Hoover Company
