= Rail Passengers Association =

U.S. railroad passenger advocacy group

- Formation: May 18, 1967; 58 years ago
- Type: Nonprofit
- Purpose: Passenger rail advocacy
- Location: Washington, DC
- President: Jim Mathews
- Website: www.railpassengers.org

The Rail Passengers Association (RPA), formerly the National Association of Railroad Passengers (NARP), is the largest advocacy organization for rail passengers in the United States.

== Early history ==
The organization was founded by Anthony Haswell in May 1967, to lobby for the continuation of passenger trains in the United States.

== Activities ==
RPA's small paid staff in Washington, D.C., spends most of its time educating members of Congress and their staffs about the value of passenger rail.

RPA publishes a newsletter eleven times a year detailing news in the passenger rail world. It often includes stories about related legislation in Congress, Traveler's Advisories, and Travel Tips, with a particular focus on Amtrak.

Members benefit from discounts on Amtrak, Via Rail, Alaska Railroad, Grand Canyon Railway, Nevada Northern Railway, and Brightline.

The organization presents the Golden Spike Award on a quasi-annual basis to "honor work done to advance the cause of a robust national rail system in the U.S." Past winners have included Congressmembers, railway unions, and rail passenger advocates.

== Organization ==
The governing body of RPA is the Council of Representatives, consisting of 112 members from fifty states plus the District of Columbia, apportioned by the number of RPA members in each state. Up to an additional ten "At-Large" Council Representatives may hold office at any one time.

RPA is divided into ten regional divisions, each headed by a Division Leader, who is also a Council Representative for one of the states included in his/her Division.

Council Representatives and Division Leaders report to a liaison on the Board of Directors. The Board of Directors includes one Chair, four Vice Chairs, one Secretary, one Treasurer, and eight Directors, for a total of fifteen members. The immediate past Chair and Treasurer hold non-voting, ex-officio, advisory roles on the Board. The Board sets the agenda for RPA's activities and the hiring of staff.

In addition to the elected leadership, the small paid staff in Washington, D.C., includes a President; Vice President for Policy; Chief of Staff; and Directors for Resource Development, and Community Engagement & Organizing.

Jim Mathews, formerly Executive Editor of the Aviation Week Intelligence Network, has served as RPA President and CEO since August 2014.
