= Chicago Pacific Corporation =

Railroad shell corporation

The Chicago Pacific Corporation was a shell corporation created from the remains of the Chicago, Rock Island and Pacific Railroad. It managed to use much of the capital made from the liquidation of the Rock Island to acquire non-rail ventures such as The Hoover Company, Pennsylvania House/Kittinger, Inc., and Rowenta. In 1988, the now profitable company was acquired by the Maytag Corporation.
