= Anthony Haswell (passenger rail advocate) =

American lawyer and passenger rail advocate

- Born: January 30, 1931; Dayton, Ohio, USA
- Died: May 17, 2024 (aged 93); Tucson, Arizona
- Occupation: Passenger Rail Advocate

Anthony Haswell was an attorney and noted passenger rail advocate in the United States.

Haswell was born on January 30, 1931, in Dayton, Ohio, son of Anthony and Virginia (Rike) Haswell. He received a Bachelor of Science degree from the University of Wisconsin in 1953, and a Bachelor of Laws degree from the University of Michigan in 1958, and worked in both private practice and as an assistant public defender in Chicago.

In 1967 he founded the National Association of Railroad Passengers, serving as its chairman and executive director through 1974. During that time he was deeply involved in the development, refinement and enactment of the legislation which created Amtrak, testifying before numerous Congressional committees and working closely with committee staff.

From 1975 to 1977, he was managing director of passenger services of the Chicago, Rock Island and Pacific Railroad, where he assisted with the transfer of the company's Chicago commuter trains to Metra. In October, 1977, President Jimmy Carter nominated Haswell to serve on the board of directors of Amtrak, but the nomination was subsequently withdrawn at Haswell's request after meeting with resistance in the United States Senate and from some union leaders.

Haswell, a longtime Arizona resident, died after a long illness on May 17, 2024. He was 93.
