= Haier Brothers =

- Directed by: Liu Zuofeng, Dai Fulin, Jing Lili, etc.
- No. of episodes: 212

Production
- Production company: Orient Maple Advertising Company

Original release
- Network: CCTV-1 (China Central Television General Channel)
- Release: July 1996 – 2009

Haier Brothers, also known as Haier Brothers: Global Adventures, is an animated series based on the cartoon mascots of the Haier brand. It first aired in July 1996, and the complete series was released by 2009. The creation of the series began in 1995 and includes a total of four parts with 212 episodes, making it a representative work of long-form "domestic animation" in China. Because it was repeatedly broadcast on children's programs on major television stations such as China Central Television (CCTV) in the late 1990s and early 2000s, Haier Brothers became a classic childhood memory for the post-90s and post-2000s generations in China.

== History ==
=== Early development ===
Before the production of Haier Brothers, Haier Group had experimented with animated advertising and cartoons starting in the early 1980s. They commissioned animation studios in Shanghai and Taiwan to create several animated commercials and two cartoon series, which already featured early prototypes of the “Haier Brothers” characters. These included a combination refrigerator commercial titled Qindao Haier, aired on CCTV in 1991; the animated series Music Island, co-produced with the Shanghai Animation Film Studio and broadcast on China Central Television during the summer of 1992; and Little Heroes of the Universe, produced around 1992 by Hong Long Animation in Taipei and Hong Ying Animation in Suzhou, which aired on CCTV’s Red, Yellow, Blue program during the summer of 1993. However, none of these branded animations met expectations in terms of storytelling or production quality. As a result, Haier Group president Zhang Ruimin once considered abandoning the idea of producing animated content altogether.

=== Decision to produce ===
Around 1995, Beijing Orient Maple Advertising Company began producing advertisements for Haier, including a series of public service announcements that featured early prototypes of the characters “Haier Brothers” and “Crude.” Haier Group president Zhang Ruimin was pleased with the results and authorized Orient Maple to begin preparations for a new animated series titled Haier Brothers.

The creative team at Orient Maple initially produced pilot episodes for the first three installments. At that stage, they could only present their work to the head of Haier Group's advertising department. If these samples had failed to surpass previous works like Qindao and Haier (i.e., Music Island and Little Heroes of the Universe), Haier Brothers might never have come to fruition. At the time, most of the creators were not based in China and held jobs at other institutions, so their scripts and animation often had a somewhat foreign flair. Aside from the protagonist “Haier,” whose name was chosen by the Haier Group, all other character names were proposed by the writers. For example, the character “Crude” is a transliteration of the English word “crude,” reflecting traits such as rudeness and lack of manners, which matched the character’s personality. The character names were finalized within the first three episodes, and the completed samples were submitted to Haier’s advertising department. The only feedback given was a single word: “Approved.”

By the end of 1995, more than half of the production work for the first 52 episodes of Haier Brothers had been completed.

=== First broadcast ===
In the summer of 1996, the first part of the Haier Brothers animated series (Episodes 1–53) premiered on CCTV’s Animation City. Due to its strong reception and positive viewer response during its 1997 rerun, Haier decided to expand the series from 53 to 106 episodes.

In February 1998, the second part of the Haier Brothers series (Episodes 54–79) premiered on Animation City.

By June 1998, the latter half of the second part (Episodes 78–106) was completed. After nearly three years of production, the full initial batch of 106 episodes was finalized. Following the completion, the creators finally met with Haier’s president Zhang Ruimin. He made only one suggestion regarding the series—changing the title from Haier Brothers to Haier Good Brothers. As Haier was the advertising agency’s major client, the team dared not refuse and changed the slogan used at the press conference to “Haier Good Brothers.” However, the official title of the series remained unchanged in the final release. Despite this, many of Haier’s promotional animated commercials released during the same period featured the characters “Haier Brothers” and “Crude,” using “Haier Good Brothers” as the advertising slogan and even incorporating it into the jingle at the end of the commercials.

From the second half of 1998 to 1999, all 106 episodes of Haier Brothers aired on Animation City.

At the 16th China TV Golden Eagle Awards in December 1998, Haier Brothers won the award for Outstanding Animated Series. In a 1999 survey conducted by CCTV, viewers gave the show widespread acclaim, praising it for combining entertainment and educational value, its vivid characters, and high rewatchability.

=== Sequel production ===
In 2001, the third part of the Haier Brothers animated series (Episodes 107–159) was broadcast on CCTV’s Animation City. Due to the continued positive reception, the creative team decided to further extend the series to a total of 212 episodes. In February, Beijing Orient Maple Advertising Company officially announced the start of production for the fourth part of the Haier Brothers series (Episodes 160–212).

Shortly before June 2001, the fourth part was completed. That same month, a special event was held in Beijing titled “Forum on the Development Trends of Chinese Animation in the New Century and the Completion Ceremony of the 200-Episode Haier Brothers Series.” The series was officially filed and archived in March 2007.

=== Complete release ===
Around 2003, Orient Maple Advertising Company transferred certain rights, including the broadcasting rights of Haier Brothers, to Mitie Xia Company under a formal contract. However, this led to a series of legal disputes, which prevented the fully completed Haier Brothers series from being aired as scheduled. The prolonged legal battle continued until 2008. As a result, the completed fourth part was never broadcast on television.

In 2009, an internal staff member released the fourth part for the first time on Baidu’s Haier Brothers forum. From that point on, the full Haier Brothers series was finally made available to the public.

Around 2012, a revised version of the complete series was released under a new title: Haier Brothers: Global Adventures.

== Characters ==
Haier Brother: Created by the Wise Old Man, he is knowledgeable, intelligent, and brave. He is skilled at thinking through problems and often leads the group to overcome dangers. Also known as Qindao, he was born in the depths of the ocean, possibly in the Pacific.

Haier Younger Brother: Also created by the Wise Old Man, he is intelligent, diligent, and always willing to help others. Like his older brother, he possesses a wealth of knowledge and serves as a reliable assistant. Also known as Haier, he was born in the depths of the ocean, possibly in the Pacific.

Crude: The youngest member of the group, Crude is naive and comical. Mischievous and careless, he often does things that make others laugh, but he also shows remarkable courage and cleverness in critical moments. His birthplace is possibly Norway.

Jenny: A beautiful and kind-hearted girl, Jenny is lively, sweet, and sincere—the only female member of the global adventure team. Her birthplace is possibly the United Kingdom.

Grandpa: Jenny’s grandfather, an old sea captain who fought in World War II. Wise and calm, he remains composed in tough situations and is an expert sailor with a wealth of experience. He teaches the group many valuable lessons.

Wise Old Man: A symbol of human knowledge and wisdom, he used advanced technology to create two robots, and sacrificed his own life to give them human souls and intelligence. He also instilled in them the scientific knowledge humanity had accumulated over time.

== Episode guide and setting ==
Many of the Haier Brothers episodes are based on real-world events, scientific facts, or popular legends, such as global warming, the Manhattan Project, or the “Strange Slope” phenomenon in Shenyang.

Episode 1	Haier Brothers Return	Episode 2	Distress in The Sea	Episode 3	Volcano Island
Episode 4	Mysterious Rocks	Episode 5	Norwegian Whirlpool	Episode 6	Sargasso Sea
Episode 7	Tomb in The Sea	Episode 8	Storm in The Polar Regions	Episode 9	Polar Day
Episode 10	Adventure in Alaska	Episode 11	Bear-hunting	Episode 12	Flying over The Canyon
Episode 13	Return Wild West	Episode 14	Adventure in The West	Episode 15	Dinosaurs’ Era
Episode 16	Return 20th Century	Episode 17	Mad’s Intrigue	Episode 18	The Valley of Ghosts
Episode 19	Black Sandstorm	Episode 20	The Buried City	Episode 21	Walking Through The Crocodile’s Jaws
Episode 22	Jenny’s in Danger!	Episode 23	Battle between a Leopard and a Python	Episode 24	Solar Eclipse
Episode 25	A War Against Ants	Episode 26	Back to Atlantis	Episode 27	Mirage
Episode 28	Get off The Tail!	Episode 29	The Wind in The Valley	Episode 30	Machu Picchu
Episode 31	Mysterious Pagoda	Episode 32	The Cold Cold Equator	Episode 33	Glacier Crisis
Episode 34	The beautiful Killer-stone	Episode 35	The Tree of Life	Episode 36	Treasure in The High Lake (Part 1)
Episode 37	Treasure in The High Lake (Part2)	Episode 38	Struggling out of Swamp	Episode 39	Unexpected Flame
Episode 40	Thrilling Chase	Episode 41	Surprising Action	Episode 42	Jenny, where are you?
Episode 43	Taming The Gee-gee	Episode 44	Jenny’s Coming-back	Episode 45	Adventure in Valley
Episode 46	The Awful Landslide	Episode 47	Mountain Collapse	Episode 48	Strange Gravity
Episode 49	Pirates’ Trick	Episode 50	Fierce Fight against Cachalot	Episode 51	The Awful Tornado
Episode 52	The Spinning Island	Episode 53	Escape Within 30 Minutes	Episode 54	The Forgotten Soldier
Episode 55	Deadly Invention	Episode 56	Stone Radar	Episode 57	Diving into The Deep (Part 1)
Episode 58	Diving into The Deep (Part 2)	Episode 59	Awesome Poisonous Killer	Episode 60	Trap The Enemy
Episode 61	A Sudden Tsunami	Episode 62	Magnetic Island	Episode 63	The Ghost Ship
Episode 64	The Komodo Island	Episode 65	Hey, Dr. Crude!	Episode 66	Pump in The Sky
Episode 67	Crude, The Savior	Episode 68	Hitting The South Pole	Episode 69	Ice Wadi
Episode 70	Crude And Penguins	Episode 71	Breaking Ice Field	Episode 72	Into The Storm Circle
Episode 73	The Moving Iceberg	Episode 74	The Invisible Killer	Episode 75	Typhoon Is Coming!
Episode 76	Ruins of Ancient Civilization	Episode 77	The Missing Pilot	Episode 78	The Silent Battle
Episode 79	Thrilling Flight	Episode 80	Emergency in The Air	Episode 81	Under The Ice Island
Episode 82	The Cracked Island	Episode 83	勇敢的克鲁德	Episode 84	Boat in The Cave
Episode 85	Crude and Koala	Episode 86	Across The Time	Episode 87	We Are not Slaves!
Episode 88	Snake Island	Episode 89	Sailing That Old-time Boat	Episode 90	The Great Barrier Reef
Episode 91	The Iron Bridge in The Wind Valley	Episode 92	Green Monsters	Episode 93	Dream Age
Episode 94	The Scalding Lake	Episode 95	Haven of Terror	Episode 96	Into Africa
Episode 97	Fighting Leopard	Episode 98	Song of Azrael	Episode 99	Young Soldiers
Episode 100	Toreader on The Cliff	Episode 101	Naughty Baboons	Episode 102	Big Guy in The Forest
Episode 103	Hunting The Hunter	Episode 104	Crazy Elephants	Episode 105	Giant and Dwarf
Episode 106	Mysterious Namolatonjar	Episode 107	Titan Deep in The Lake	Episode 108	Man-shaped Leopard
Episode 109	Firework in The Dark Cloud	Episode 110	A Journey into Mollala Kingdom	Episode 111	The Tanzania-Zambian Railway
Episode 112	Sailing in The Forest (Part1)	Episode 113	Sailing in The Forest (Part2)	Episode 114	The Broken Life chain
Episode 115	A Permanent Secret	Episode 116	The Vanishing Mine	Episode 117	Slurry-spurting Lake
Episode 118	Fire of The Red Sea	Episode 119	Pilgrim to Mekka	Episode 120	African Drum
Episode 121	The Lost Roman	Episode 122	Jenny and Bonny	Episode 123	Drilling The Water-jar-ridge
Episode 124	Legend of The Nile	Episode 125	Towards Nile	Episode 126	Adventure in The Nile
Episode 127	Pyramids	Episode 128	Emergency of Whale Swarm	Episode 129	The Invisible Little Devil
Episode 130	The Curious King	Episode 131	Fane in The Valley	Episode 132	Shadow of Tutankamen
Episode 133	Jenny, The Supergirl	Episode 134	Magical Sea	Episode 135	The Rising Waterfall
Episode 136	Adventure in The Castle	Episode 137	Haier Brothers vs. Archimedes	Episode 138	A Night in Rome
Episode 139	The Frightening Shadow	Episode 140	10,000 Voltage	Episode 141	Hercules
Episode 142	Guard of Valley	Episode 143	Drum-beat in The Midnight	Episode 144	Mini Storm
Episode 145	Martin’s Apocalypse	Episode 146	The Sand-surrounded Sea	Episode 147	Heaven’s Anger
Episode 148	The Burning Focus	Episode 149	The World through A Pinhole	Episode 150	Hacker’s Attack
Episode 151	On The Edge of The Nuclear Winter	Episode 152	The Underground Arsenal	Episode 153	Explosions in The Sun
Episode 154	Robot and The Elder Haier	Episode 155	Lifeguard, Lemon	Episode 156	Downtown Tiger
Episode 157	Silent Calling	Episode 158	Sleeping Pilot	Episode 159	Between Wolves And Eagles
Episode 160	Oriental Pompeii	Episode 161	The Legend of General Zuo (Serindian War)	Episode 162	The Time of Kroranla Empire
Episode 163	God of Nian Wind	Episode 164	Breaking Through The Flame Mountain	Episode 165	Adventure in Kongdong Mountain
Episode 166	The Tiger-jump Mountain	Episode 167	Thousands Years’ Electricity Power Supply	Episode 168	Ancient Prison of Labyrinth
Episode 169	Army Underground	Episode 170	The Wonder of Qianlong’s Tomb	Episode 171	Unveiling The Trick of Witch
Episode 172	The Heaven’s Pit in Xiaozhai	Episode 173	Tibetan Mini Horse	Episode 174	The Long-life-Tree
Episode 175	The Floating Temple	Episode 176	Great Python in Daliang Mountain	Episode 177	Music of The Dragon Lake
Episode 178	Heaven’s Pillar	Episode 179	Waking up The SownMountain	Episode 180	White Monkeys of Shimen
Episode 181	Coffins on The Cliff	Episode 182	Saga of WuYishan	Episode 183	Playing with Qiantang River-tide
Episode 184	Saving King from The Xuehong Cave	Episode 185	Shennongjia Lake Monster	Episode 186	Ice Bombs
Episode 187	City of Underwater	Episode 188	Glory of Buddha	Episode 189	The Mini Buddala Palace
Episode 190	Restoring The Nine-dragon-Wall	Episode 191	Changes of Beijing	Episode 192	The Stainless Copper Mirror
Episode 193	Nadamu Meeting	Episode 194	Curly Light Beam	Episode 195	The Reticent Forest Watcher
Episode 196	Myth of The New Throne	Episode 197	Strange Top	Episode 198	Crookback in The Bell Tower
Episode 199	A Dream of Nanjing	Episode 200	Shanghai Affair	Episode 201	The Shaking Fuji
Episode 202	The Butterfly Kingdom	Episode 203	The Beautiful Nautilus	Episode 204	The Gigantic Lizard
Episode 205	The Flower And The Greedy Bees	Episode 206	Legend of The King of Beasts	Episode 207	Advice from A Maskman
Episode 208	Master Crude	Episode 209	The Blood-red Diamond	Episode 210	Samoa Leap
Episode 211	Master of Wisdom Returns	Episode 212	Haier Brother Reborn		

== Plot summary ==
Created by a wise elder, the Haier Brothers and their friends embark on a global adventure to solve the crises facing humanity and to uncover countless natural mysteries. Their journey spans across the world—from the Pacific Ocean, through North and South America, Antarctica, Australia, Africa, Europe, and Asia—ultimately returning to the Pacific, the place of their origin.

The first 106 episodes depict the birth of the Haier Brothers and their travels with friends across the North Pacific into the Arctic, where they meet the diligent and brave Inuit and witness the natural wonder of the polar day. They cross the vast North American continent and the mysterious South American rainforests. Along the way, they overcome dangerous threats such as a fierce flying python and aggressive pirates, escape from the spinning island, and witness the illusion of a mirage. After flying over Australia, they step onto the African continent.

The next 106 episodes follow the group as they sail across the Persian Gulf and fly over the Mediterranean to reach the beautiful continent of Europe. Using their scientific knowledge, the Haier Brothers predict an upcoming tsunami, and Crude saves a native child choking on a bone using the Heimlich maneuver. While searching for water, they befriend a native girl. They brave the trials of the “Fire of the Red Sea” and fall into the world-famous Dead Sea. Due to a landslide caused by the complex Kost terrain, even their temporary shelter—a castle—collapses. After enduring many hardships, the team finally reaches China by passing through the ancient Silk Road. Eventually, they arrive in the peaceful and warm eastern part of Asia, from where they return to their birthplace—the Pacific Ocean.

== Original soundtrack ==
The original songs and music for the animated series were composed by Qi Xiaoyuan, with lyrics written by Zhang Jingping. Although the songs were never officially titled, the theme song is commonly referred to as “The Song of Leo” (Lei'ou zhi ge) in official programs.

- Theme Song: “The Song of Leo” (“Thunder Brings the Rain”)

Lead Vocal: Jiang Xiaohan， Chorus: Black Duck Singing Group

- Insert Song 1: “The Song of the Ocean” (“The ocean brings me back home”)

Lyrics excerpt: “Birds are flying, fish are swimming...”

- Insert Song 2: “The Song of Peace” (“Searching for the sunlight of peace”)

Lyrics excerpt: “The sea breeze brings crashing waves, sh-sh-sh...”

- Narrated with Music: “Home in Our Eyes”

== Release ==
=== Comic book series ===
In 1996, to coincide with the broadcast of the animated series, a Haier Brothers comic book series was illustrated by the Hongye Advertising Company and published by the China Lianhuanhua Publishing House. These comics were adapted from the original animation storyboards, with each volume covering the content of approximately 5 to 7 episodes. The first series consisted of 10 volumes, with the following initial publication dates:

- Volume 1: First edition published in May 1996
- Volume 2: First edition published in June 1996
- Volume 3: First edition published in August 1996
- Volumes 4 & 5: First editions published in December 1996
- Volumes 6 & 7: First editions published in January 1997
- Volume 8: First edition published in March 1997
- Volumes 9 & 10: First editions published in May 1997

In 1998, the second series was released, also consisting of 10 volumes, with the first edition published in April 1998.

=== Audio-visual media releases ===
China Children's Press & Publication Group

- 1996 – Season 1 VHS Release: ISRC CN-M34-96-300-00/V.J9

China Youth Audio-Visual Publishing House

- 1998 – Seasons 1 & 2 VCDs: ISRC CN-A71-98-311-01 to CN-A71-98-312-07
- 2001 – Seasons 1 & 2 VCDs (Labeled "New Edition"): ISRC CN-A71-01-301-01 to CN-A71-01-311-15
- 2001 – Season 3 VCDs: ISRC CN-A71-01-302-01 to CN-A71-01-302-01
- 2004 – Seasons 1–3 DVDs: ISRC CN-A71-04-0010-0

== Subsequent impact ==
To promote the series, the rights holder of the Haier brand launched a campaign called "Big Picture: Haier Brothers" around 2014.

In 2024, the characters of Haier Brothers and their theme song “The Song of Leo” made a special appearance in the performance “We Grew Up Watching Cartoons” on the 2024 CCTV Spring Festival Gala2024 CCTV Spring Festival Gala.

== Reception ==
Since its debut in 1995, Haier Brothers has received relatively widespread attention and positive feedback from viewers, and it holds a certain level of influence in the field of Chinese animation and popular culture. As of December 11, 2023, the series holds a rating of 8.3 on the Douban platform, with a large number of user reviews, reflecting its level of recognition among audiences. Some viewers consider it one of the representative early domestic science-themed animated series, with a presentation style that stands out compared to other works of the same period. For example, the show incorporates scientific knowledge into its storyline, introducing related concepts as characters encounter problems during their adventures, allowing viewers to learn basic scientific principles as the story progresses. Plotlines such as using the principle of leverage to solve a deserted island crisis or applying the law of buoyancy to escape from a whirlpool are seen as effectively transforming dull theories into concrete narratives. These elements are considered to stimulate children's interest in learning and have also been positively received by some parents.

Haier Brothers is one of the first large-scale science education animations produced in China. The series consists of 212 episodes, covering a wide range of topics including global geography, culture, history, and natural sciences. The storyline follows the Haier Brothers as they set off from the Pacific Ocean, traveling through North America, South America, Antarctica, Oceania, Africa, Europe, and Asia, before finally returning to the Pacific in a round-the-world adventure. Throughout the series, viewers are introduced to representative cultural and geographical elements such as the Amazon rainforest, the Egyptian pyramids, and the Pyrenees Mountains. Each episode concludes with a knowledge quiz segment, which is considered to have educational value by helping children learn fundamental knowledge beyond their textbooks while watching the animation.

In 2018, China Daily reported on the sci-fi remake of the animation, which included space-age costumes and futuristic settings, describing it as part of a broader effort to promote domestic children’s culture and science education. This new version was developed based on preliminary testing with children and sparked heated public debate, with some nostalgic viewers calling the redesign a destruction of their childhood, while others welcomed the modernization.

In March 2025, the high-definition remastered version of Haier Brothers was simultaneously released on multiple platforms including Mango TV, iQiyi, Tencent Video, Youku, and Bilibili. On its first day, it garnered over 30 million views, and within three days, the total views surpassed 100 million. This successful remaster reignited nostalgia among the generations born in the 1980s and 1990s, and also resonated strongly with younger audiences born after 2000. The barrage of “Ye Qing Hui” comments on the platform testified to its cultural influence across different generations.

== Awards ==
year	Award Ceremony	Awards	result	Ginseng
1998	The 4th National Children's Television "Golden Boy Award"	Second Prize for Animated Program	Awards	
1998	The 16th China TV Golden Eagle Awards	Outstanding Work Award in the TV Animation Category	Awards	
