= Mabe (company) =

Mexican company

Controladora Mabe
- Type: Private
- Founded: 1946; 80 years ago
- Headquarters: Mexico City, Mexico
- Key people: Luis Berrondo Avalos (Chairman and CEO); Urbano Perez (Vice Chairman and SVP); Javier Burkle (CFO); Rogelio Arizpe (CTO)
- Products: White appliances
- Revenue: ▲$4 billion
- Owners: GE Appliances (48.4%)
- Number of employees: 20,000
- Website: www.mabe.com.mx

Mabe is a Mexican company that designs, produces, and distributes appliances to more than 70 countries around the world. It was founded in Mexico City in 1946.

== History ==
Mabe was incorporated in Mexico City in 1946 by Egon Mabardi and Francisco Berrondo, both Spanish refugees who escaped the turmoil of the Spanish Civil War, to manufacture kitchen furniture. In the 1950s, Mabe began manufacturing various appliances such as gas ranges and refrigerators.

In 1986, Mabe entered into a joint venture with General Electric to produce appliances for the US market where GE received a 48% minority stake. By the mid-1990s, more than two-thirds of all gas ranges and refrigerators imported into the United States were designed and manufactured by Mabe, and 95% of those sold under the General Electric brands were designed in Mabe's San Luis Potosi plant. As a result, Mabe became the leading brand in Mexico, moving ahead of Vitro's Acros brand with a domestic market share of 50%.

As the company continued to grow, exports and production remained concentrated in Latin America. By the mid-1990s, Mabe was one of the leading appliance manufacturers in the world with annual growth between 15 and 20%. In Mexico, Mabe all but dominated the market, while in Latin America, Mabe commanded a 70% market share in home appliances.

The group also entered into several joint ventures and alliances with other regional manufacturers. Solid sales growth in Latin America all but eliminated the impact of the peso crisis in 1995.

In 2016, General Electric sold its GE Appliances business to China-based Haier. The transaction included the 48.4% minority stake that GE held in Mabe.

== Main products ==
In Latin America, Mabe held the rights to distribute their products under a variety of well-known brands, such as GE and several regional brands. The regional brands were well-established in their respective countries.
