= GE Selmer plant =

- Operated: 1986–present
- Location: 1020 Tennessee Avenue; Selmer, Tennessee, United States
- Coordinates: 35.1983°N 88.6187°W
- Industry: Home appliances
- Products: built-in refrigerators; PTACs
- Employees: 465
- Volume: 330,000 square feet (31,000 m^{2})
- Owner: General Electric

GE Selmer plant is an appliance manufacturing plant in Selmer, Tennessee, owned by GE Appliances, formerly a division of General Electric.

== History ==
The plant was opened in 1986 as Monogram Refrigeration LLC.

In 2013, GE announced a $20 million upgrade at the Selmer, Tennessee, Monogram Refrigeration plant to launch a new French door built-in refrigerator platform. The upgrade included retooling assembly lines and installing new metal stamping and welding equipment to insource more parts.

In August 2017, GE Appliances announced a $9.3 million investment to add a 120,000-square-foot facility expansion, two new assembly lines, and shift production of Zoneline PTACs from Appliance Park, create approximately 210 new jobs, effectively doubling the workforce at the plant.

In 2021, GE Applainces invested $5 million to move production of Zoneline vertical terminal air conditioners (VTACs) from Mexico back to the United States. This investment added a fifth assembly line, creating 33 new jobs and increasing the plant's total workforce to 465 employees.

In August 2023, GE Appliances invested $34 million to expand its Monogram Refrigeration plant in Selmer, Tennessee. The upgrade added new fabrication equipment and an assembly line for premium bottom-freezer refrigerators, doubling the capacity of Building Two and creating 150 jobs.
