= Haer =

Haer may refer to:

- Haer, Senegal, a village in the Bignona Department of Senegal
- Haer, Punjab, a village in Punjab, India
- Haier, a Chinese electronics firm
- HAER, the Historic American Engineering Record
