= Hotpoint =

Brand of domestic appliances

- Industry: Home appliances
- Founded: 1911; 115 years ago in Ontario, California, United States
- Founder: Earl Richardson
- Products: Washing machines, dishwashers, refrigerators, freezers, cookers, tumble dryers
- Owners: Americas: GE Appliances (Haier); Europe: Beko Europe
- Website: hotpoint.com (Americas) hotpoint.eu (pan-Europe)

Hotpoint is a brand of domestic appliances. In Europe, the brand is part of the portfolio of Beko Europe, a joint venture between Arçelik and Whirlpool Corporation, while in the Americas it is used by GE Appliances, a subsidiary of Haier.

== History ==
=== Pacific Electric Heating Company ===
The company name Hotpoint comes from the hot point of the innovative first electric iron. Invented by American, Earl Richardson (1871–1934) in 1905, he subsequently formed his Pacific Electric Heating Co. in Ontario, California, in 1906. The device became known as the Hotpoint iron, with its hottest point at the front and not the center.

=== Hotpoint ===
Hotpoint was founded in 1911 by Earl Richardson.

=== Hotpoint Electric Heating Company ===
In 1912, the company began making electric irons, and in 1919, electric cookers in the United States. Earl Richardson also invented the first iron that switched off automatically when a maximum temperature was reached.

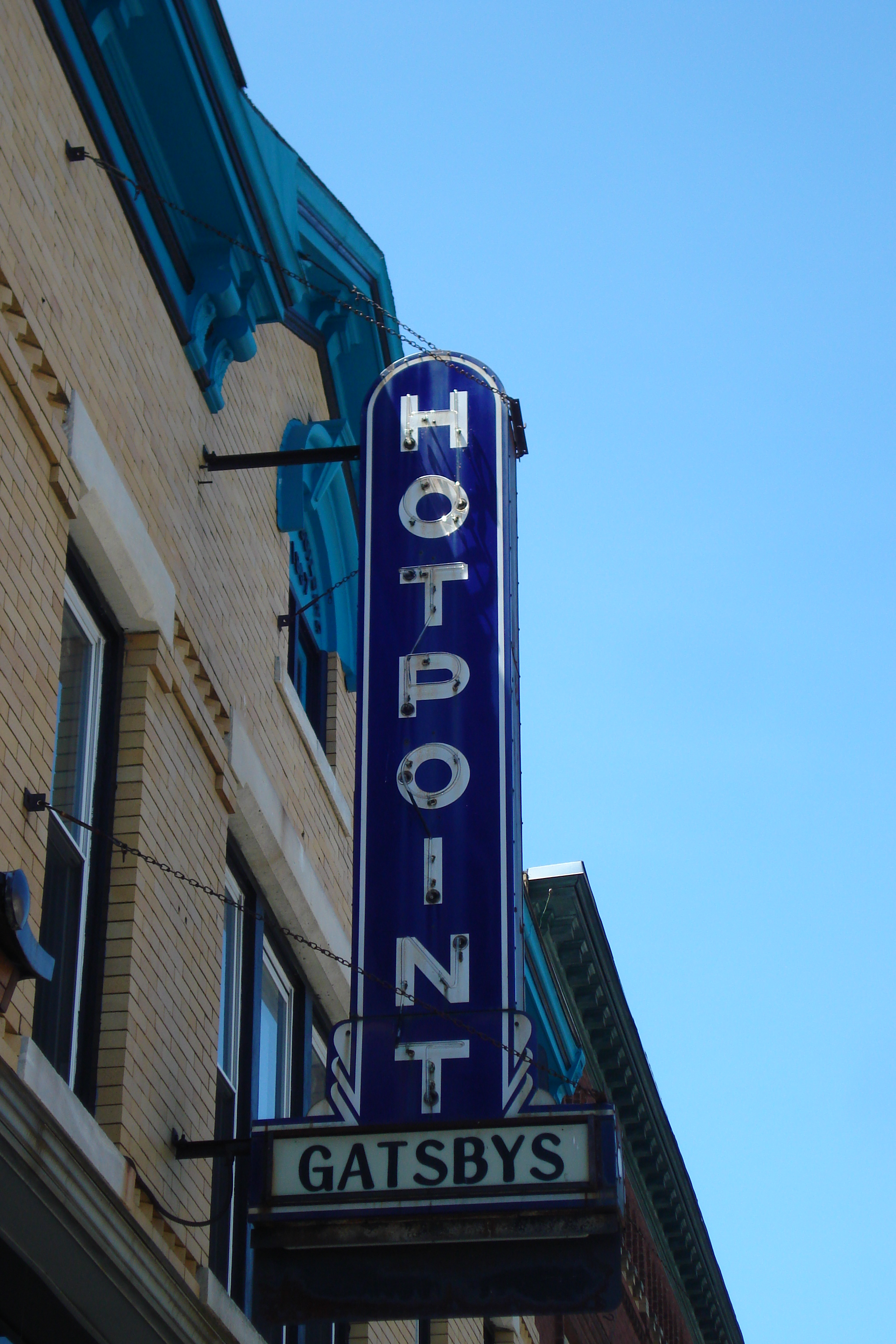
Hotpoint sign in Great Barrington, Massachusetts

It is claimed to have developed one of the earliest electric toasters in 1908, known as the El Tosto, and later, under GE, the Hotpoint brand name became one of the most popular brands of toasters in the United States in the 1920s and 1930s. Richardson founded his settlement, Adelanto, California, in 1915.

=== Edison Electric Appliance Company ===
In 1918, the company, known as the Hotpoint Electric Heating Co., merged with the Heating Device Section of General Electric, becoming the Edison Electric Appliance Co.

=== Hotpoint Electric Appliance Company ===
In 1920, it established a joint venture with competitor General Electric, forming the Hotpoint Electric Appliance Co. Limited (HEAC) to market GE (USA) branded goods in the United Kingdom.

=== Edison General Electric Company ===
In 1927, GE bought the factory and entire company. It became known as the Edison General Electric Co. in 1931.

Most Hotpoint production moved to GE's mammoth Appliance Park manufacturing complex in Louisville, Kentucky, in the beginning of the 1950s. To this day, many Hotpoint appliances are made at Louisville, and as of 2013 was the largest appliance plant in the world.

=== GEC ===
In 1929, HEAC joined the Associated Electrical Industries (AEI) group, itself bought by The General Electric Company in 1967. By the 1960s it was the market leader in household electrical appliances in the United Kingdom, followed by Sweden's Electrolux.

=== GDA ===
Hotpoint continued as a subsidiary of GE until 1989, when it was merged into a new division of GE called General Domestic Appliances (GDA). 50% of GDA was purchased by General Electric (USA), with whom it owned the joint venture. In 1998, the Redring and Xpelair brands also joined GDA, and Hotpoint was categorized as part of GDA Applied Energy.

=== Indesit ===
Merloni Elettrodomestici finalized its acquisition of a 50% stake in GDA in 2002. This deal, authorized by the European Commission, made Merloni Europe's third-largest producer in the sector and the market leader in the UK At that point, Hotpoint employed around 7,000 people at its four sites in the United Kingdom, three of which later closed. Indesit UK has been based at Hotpoint headquarters in Peterborough since 1 June 2003.

In 2005, Merloni Elettrodomestici rebranded to become Indesit Company.

At the beginning of 2007, Indesit launched the group's new brand architecture, Hotpoint, and combined with Ariston to form the Hotpoint-Ariston brand.

In December 2008, Indesit acquired the final quota of shares from General Electric for US$57m. From the end of 2011, Indesit rolled out the Hotpoint brand name across Europe, replacing the names Ariston and Hotpoint Ariston.

=== Whirlpool ===
In October 2014, Whirlpool paid 56% of the purchased by for UK only marketing whilst Haier bought out 44% for US. Whirlpool's had a turbulent ownership of Hotpoint and Indesit as in 2015, Indesit released a statement announcing a safety alert for certain models of tumble dryers produced between 2004 and 2015 due to a design flaw which caused large particles of lint to escape the fluff filter into the dryer and build up around the heating element bank which posed a risk of fire. In 2016, Whirlpool began sending out engineers to perform safety modifications to the recalled dryers. In July 2019, Whirlpool finally issued a recall for the appliances, stating that up to 800,000 machines would either be replaced or repaired.

In December 2019, Whirlpool announced a safety recall for certain models of Hotpoint and Indesit washing machines manufactured between 2014 and 2018, due to faulty door interlocks that could cause the machines to catch fire.

=== Haier ===
In September 2014, Electrolux agreed to buy General Electric's household appliances business including the Hotpoint brand in North America for £2bn ($3.3bn). The deal was expected to close in 2015. Due to blockage by U.S. regulators, the Electrolux deal was terminated, and GE subsequently sold its appliance division to Haier of China, to close in 2016.

=== Arçelik ===
In 2022, Turkish white goods manufacturer Arçelik agreed to buy Whirpool's Russian arm including use of the Hotpoint brand. The deal included Whirlpool's sales operations in Kazakhstan and selected countries in the Commonwealth of Independent States.

In January 2023, Arçelik and Whirlpool agreed to combine their European business with Arçelik owning a 75% share. The new entity will own rights to the Hotpoint brand in Europe. In February 2024, Britain's antitrust regulator provisionally cleared the deal. This followed approved by EU antitrust regulators in October 2023.

== Products ==
Hotpoint was formed in 1911 in California and entered the British market in 1920. It is well known for its refrigerators and washing machines. The company, including sister brands Creda and Indesit, at one time produced the largest amount of kitchen appliances in the United Kingdom. The headquarters was in Woodston, Peterborough with about 1,500 people based there making fridges and freezers. The refrigeration plant closed in 2008.

== Grenfell Tower fire ==
In June 2017, a Hotpoint FF175BP fridge freezer was found to have triggered the Grenfell Tower fire in London that killed 72 people. A total of 64,000 units of the same model were manufactured between 2006 and 2009 by Indesit under the Hotpoint brand before moving over to Whirlpool.

Customers who believed they own either the FF175BP or the FF175BG models have been advised to contact the company for further safety checks. According to the Hotpoint website: “We have been made aware that the recent fire at Grenfell Tower in West London may have originated in a Hotpoint branded fridge freezer, manufactured between March 2006 and July 2009, model numbers FF175BP (Polar White) and FF175BG (Graphite)".

In October 2018, Whirlpool notified customers that they did not find anything that posed a risk to the customers, and claimed that the London Fire Brigade’s investigation into the cause of the fire had found that some electrical cabling behind the fridge freezer, or an incorrectly discarded cigarette on the kitchen window may have started the fire. In fact, the investigation found that the fire had been started by a fault with the wiring of the Hotpoint fridge-freezer itself.

== Manufacturing sites ==
The last remaining Hotpoint manufacturing site in operation in the UK, the Yate plant, was closed on 31 December 2024 after 104 years of operation. All appliances are now made in Italy and Poland as well as Turkey as opposed to the United Kingdom. Hotpoint washing machines were formerly manufactured at a plant in Llandudno Junction, in Conwy County Borough, North Wales, United Kingdom. The site made around 800,000 washing machines in 2007, with about 1,000 employees. It is now the North Wales base of the Senedd.

Their refrigeration products, formerly manufactured at the Peterborough factory, now are made in Poland. It has a distribution centre at Raunds.

=== Site closures ===
Indesit UK's (former GDA) Creda plant in Blythe Bridge, Stoke-on-Trent closed in December 2007. Closure of the manufacturing facilities at Peterborough followed in the end of 2008. On 31 July 2009, Indesit closed its plant at Kinmel Park, in Bodelwyddan Denbighshire, Wales. The factory employed 305 workers. The company blamed "continuing decline" in the market.

In October 2024, Beko Europe confirmed that the manufacturing site at Yate, the only one to still be producing tumble dryers in the UK was to cease manufacturing and close on 31 December that same year, after 104 years of operation, this resulted in a total of 142 people being made redundant.

With the closure of this site, it brings an end to Tumble Dryer production in the UK. Beko Europe claimed that the site "had been operating at a loss for some time, despite continued investment." They blamed this on declining sales of tumble dryers in the UK, as well as people moving to using more efficient machines in an effort to reduce running costs.

=== United States ===
In the United States, Hotpoint-branded products are made by GE Appliances at the Appliance Park in Louisville, Kentucky.

== Marketing ==
In 2002, it had a 23% share of the white goods market in the United Kingdom. The Holby City actress Lisa Faulkner starred in their 2010 Campaign for Cooking Confidence.

In 2009, it worked with Kelly Hoppen to produce its interior design Hot Style campaign. The company has also worked in conjunction with the P&G detergent brand Ariel. It currently recommends Ariel. Before 2004, Hotpoint recommended Unilever brands; Persil & Comfort. In the past it has also recommended Glist dishwasher tablets.

Actress Mary Tyler Moore appeared in a series of 1950s television commercials for the company as a character called "Happy Hotpoint", prior to her fame in television comedy series during the next two decades.
