= GE Camden plant =

- Operated: 2000–present
- Location: 50 Haier Boulevard; Camden, South Carolina, United States
- Coordinates: 34°12′59″N 80°34′3″W
- Industry: Home appliances
- Products: water heaters
- Employees: 140
- Volume: 259,000 square feet (24,100 m^{2})
- Owner: General Electric

GE Camden plant is an appliance manufacturing plant in Camden, South Carolina, owned by GE Appliances, a subsidiary of Haier.

== History ==
The plant was opened by Haier in March 2000 to produce compact refrigerators and wine cellars, one year after it entered the U.S. market. This was the first Chinese-owned manufacturing plant in the United States.

In August 2015, Haier America announced a $72 million expansion of its $40-million Camden refrigerator plant, creating 410 new jobs and adding 250,000 square feet to the facility. In 2016, it become a GE plant after Haier purchased GE Appliances.

In September 2019, GE Appliances announced a $60 million investment to transform its Camden, South Carolina plant into a water heater manufacturing center of excellence. The site was reopened on May 11, 2022, as a $70 million, state-of-the-art GE plant dedicated to water heater manufacturing.
