= Thunderobot =

Chinese electronics company

Qingdao Thunderobot Technology Co., Ltd.
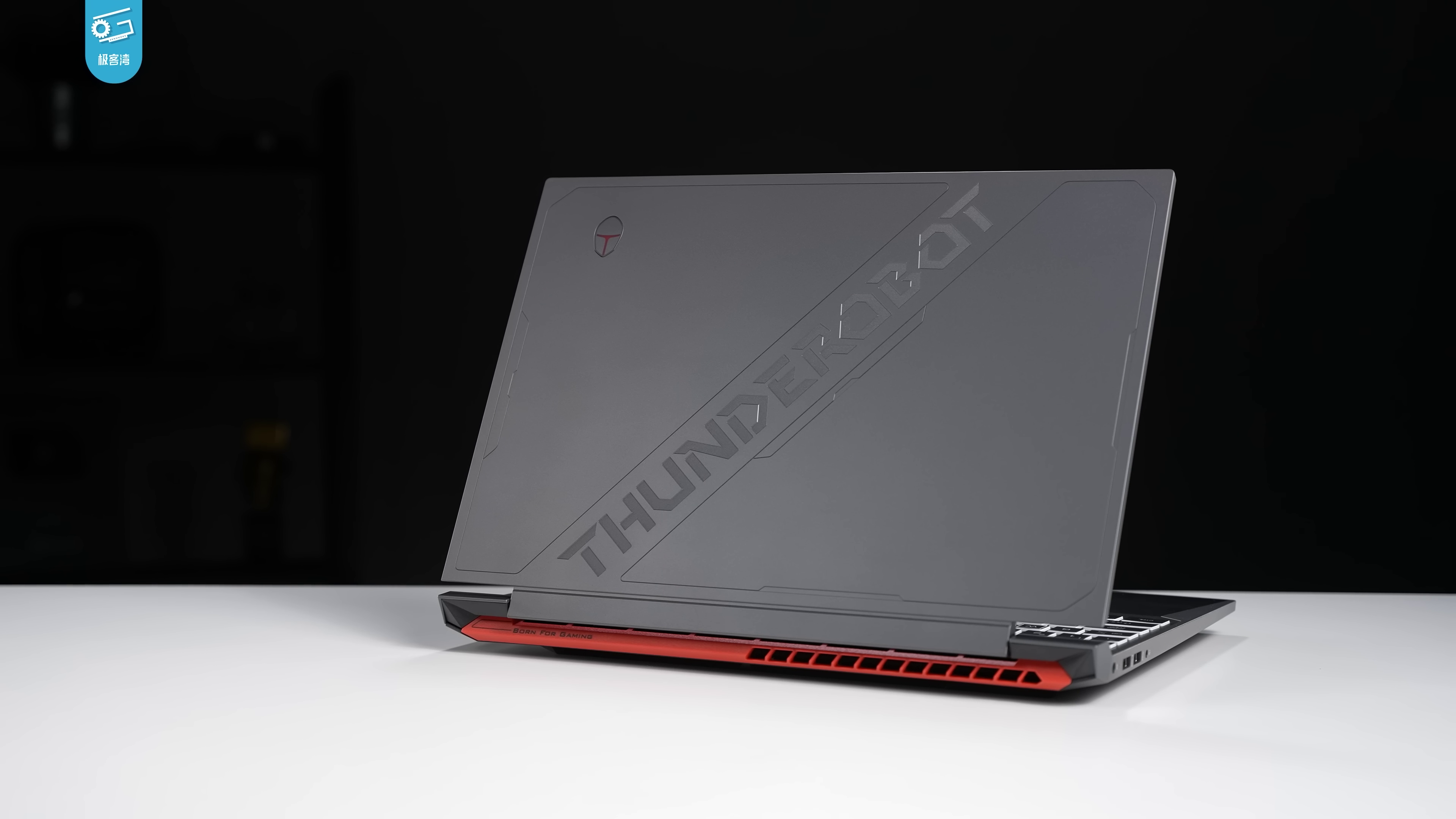
- Thunder Robot computer
- Trade name: THUNDEROBOT
- Native name: 青岛雷神科技股份有限公司
- Type: Public
- Traded as: BSE: 920190
- Industry: Computer hardware, Consumer electronics, Esports
- Founded: 2014; 12 years ago
- Headquarters: Qingdao, Shandong, China
- Products: Gaming laptops, desktop computers, Mini PCs, monitors, gaming peripherals (keyboards, mice, gamepads)
- Parent: Haier Group
- Website: global.thunderobot.com

Qingdao Thunderobot Technology Co., Ltd., trading as THUNDEROBOT (Chinese: 雷神; pinyin: Léishén; lit. 'Thunder god', also stylized as ThundeRobot) is a Chinese computer hardware company that specializes in gaming notebooks, desktops, and computer gaming peripherals. Founded in 2014 as an innovative enterprise incubated by the Haier Group under its "RenDanHeYi" management model.

== History and operations ==
Following its establishment in 2014, THUNDEROBOT focused on the domestic Chinese market before advancing a global layout. The company has established a localized system for research and development, manufacturing, and marketing, expanding its presence to 45 countries and regions and serving an estimated 10 million users. On December 23, 2022, THUNDEROBOT went public on the Beijing Stock Exchange (Stock code: 920190), becoming the first publicly traded company in the esports equipment sector on the exchange.

Beyond hardware manufacturing, THUNDEROBOT has expanded its business ecosystem into esports lifestyle sectors, including the operation of esports hotels and the organization of gaming tournaments.

== Products and innovation ==
THUNDEROBOT design and manufactures a variety of laptops, desktop PCs, monitors, peripherals, routers and projectors. Its primary gaming laptop lineups include the flagship ZERO series, the Radiant series, and the Storm series.

=== Ultra-portable gaming and Mini PCs ===
At the 2026 Consumer Electronics Show (CES), THUNDEROBOT unveiled the ZERO Air, an ultra-thin gaming laptop. Weighing only 1.58 kg and measuring 15.9 mm thick, it combines an ultrabook form factor with high-performance hardware, utilizing Intel's "Panther Lake" Core Ultra processors and Nvidia GeForce RTX 50-series GPUs. The company has also expanded its compact desktop lineup with the MIX Mini PC series. These small-form-factor machines pack high-end gaming components into sub-2-liter chassis, offering a highly portable alternative to traditional desktop towers.

=== Information Technology Application Innovation (ITAI) ===
Operating under a dual-driven strategy of "Esports + ITAI" (Xin Chuang), THUNDEROBOT has significantly expanded into enterprise and government sectors using domestically developed technologies. In the consumer space, the company released the "Black Warrior" (黑武士) gaming PC in late 2025, built around the Chinese Hygon C86 CPU. This marked a significant milestone for domestically-built processors achieving performance capable of running AAA games and modern esports titles. In the commercial space, the company provides hardware such as servers, cloud terminals, and thin clients for over 300 ITAI projects across finance, education, and healthcare industries.

== Esports involvement ==
The brand has been deeply involved in the esports industry since its early years. In 2015, the company founded its own professional esports organization, THUNDEROBOT Gaming (TRG), which fielded rosters in titles such as Dota 2 and League of Legends. Furthermore, THUNDEROBOT has acted as a strategic hardware sponsor for prominent esports teams; notably, in 2019, they became an official sponsor for Suning Gaming (SN), a top-tier team competing in the League of Legends Pro League (LPL).

== Awards and recognition ==
THUNDEROBOT has been recognized for both its business growth and product design. The company was recognized as a National High-Tech Enterprise in China and was listed among Forbes China's "Top 30 Globalizing Leading Brands." Additionally, it has been featured on the World Brand Lab's "China's 500 Most Valuable Brands" list for several consecutive years.

In terms of hardware aesthetics, notable award-winning products include the THUNDEROBOT ZERO laptop, the ML703 Mouse, and the Scorpion Gamepad G70, all of which have won the prestigious Red Dot Design Award, as well as various products receiving the iF Design Award.
