= GE LaFayette plant =

- Operated: 1973–present
- Location: 1507 Broomtown Road; LaFayette, Georgia, United States
- Coordinates: 34°40′42″N 85°17′56″W
- Industry: Home appliances
- Products: gas ranges; electric ranges; cooktops; wall ovens
- Employees: 2,500
- Volume: 1,200,000 square feet (110,000 m^{2})
- Owner: General Electric
- Website: www.ropercorp.com

GE LaFayette plant is an appliance manufacturing plant in LaFayette, Georgia, owned by GE Appliances, formerly a division of General Electric.

== History ==
In 1973, Roper Corporation, which was an independent company, established its manufacturing plant in LaFayette, Georgia. In 1988, General Electric acquired Roper Corporation (and the LaFayette plant) making the subsidiary wholly-owned.

During the 2008-2009 economic recession, the plant faced a 35% drop in demand for cooking appliances. To right-size output, the company placed between 120 and 258 employees on temporary lack of work statuses or "furloughs" starting in early 2009.

In 2013, the facility expanded its metal fabrication capabilities to support new wall oven lines. In July 2023, the company marked 50 years of building cooking products at its Roper subsidiary in Georgia by investing $118 million in new assembly lines, presses, and workforce programs, including shifting back of gas ranges from Mexico.
