= RCA television plant (Bloomington, Indiana) =

Former American television manufacturing plant

- Operated: 1940–1998
- Location: 1525 South Rogers Street; Bloomington, Indiana, United States
- Industry: Electronics
- Products: televisions
- Employees: 8,300 (1966)
- Volume: 1,500,000 square feet (140,000 m^{2})
- Owner: Radio Corporation of America

The RCA television plant in Bloomington, Indiana was a television manufacturing plant owned by RCA Corporation. The plant was operated from 1940 to 1998 and produced various products, including over 65 million televisions.

== History ==
The plant was established in 1940 when Radio Corporation of America opened a radio manufacturing plant in Bloomington, Indiana after purchasing the Showers Brothers Furniture Company, with production starting that same year. Later, the plant shifted to television production in 1949, with the first TV coming off the line on September 6 of the year.

On March 25, 1954, the plant launched the mass production of its first commercial color television set, the CT-100, featuring a 15-inch screen and selling for about $1,000, with early production rates of around 2,000 units per month. In the late 1960s, the plant employees over 8,000 people.

In 1986, the company, including its television manufacturing plant, was acquired by General Electric. Later, GE began production of its large-screen, GE-branded televisions to the RCA television plant on February 23, 1987, bringing some of its own production back from Matsushita.

In July 1987, GE sold its consumer electronics division, which included the RCA television manufacturing plant in Bloomington, Indiana, along with both RCA and GE brands, to the French company Thomson.

On February 13, 1997, Thomson Consumer Electronics announced it would close its RCA television plant in Bloomington, Indiana; over 1,100 jobs were lost in Bloomington and 420 in its Indianapolis plastic cabinet molding plant, shifting production to Ciudad Juárez, Mexico. The plant closed on April 1, 1998, and the final television was rolled off the production line on the same date.

== See also ==
- GE Bloomington plant, another plant owned by General Electric, which owned RCA from 1986 to 1988
