= Candy (company) =

Italian domestic appliance maker

Candy S.p.A.
- Formerly: OMEF – Officine Meccaniche Eden Fumagalli (1927–1961)
- Type: Subsidiary
- Industry: Home appliance
- Founded: 1927; 99 years ago
- Founder: Eden Fumagalli
- Headquarters: Brugherio, Italy
- Area served: Worldwide
- Products: Home appliances
- Owner: Haier Europe (100%)
- Parent: Haier
- Website: www.candy-group.com

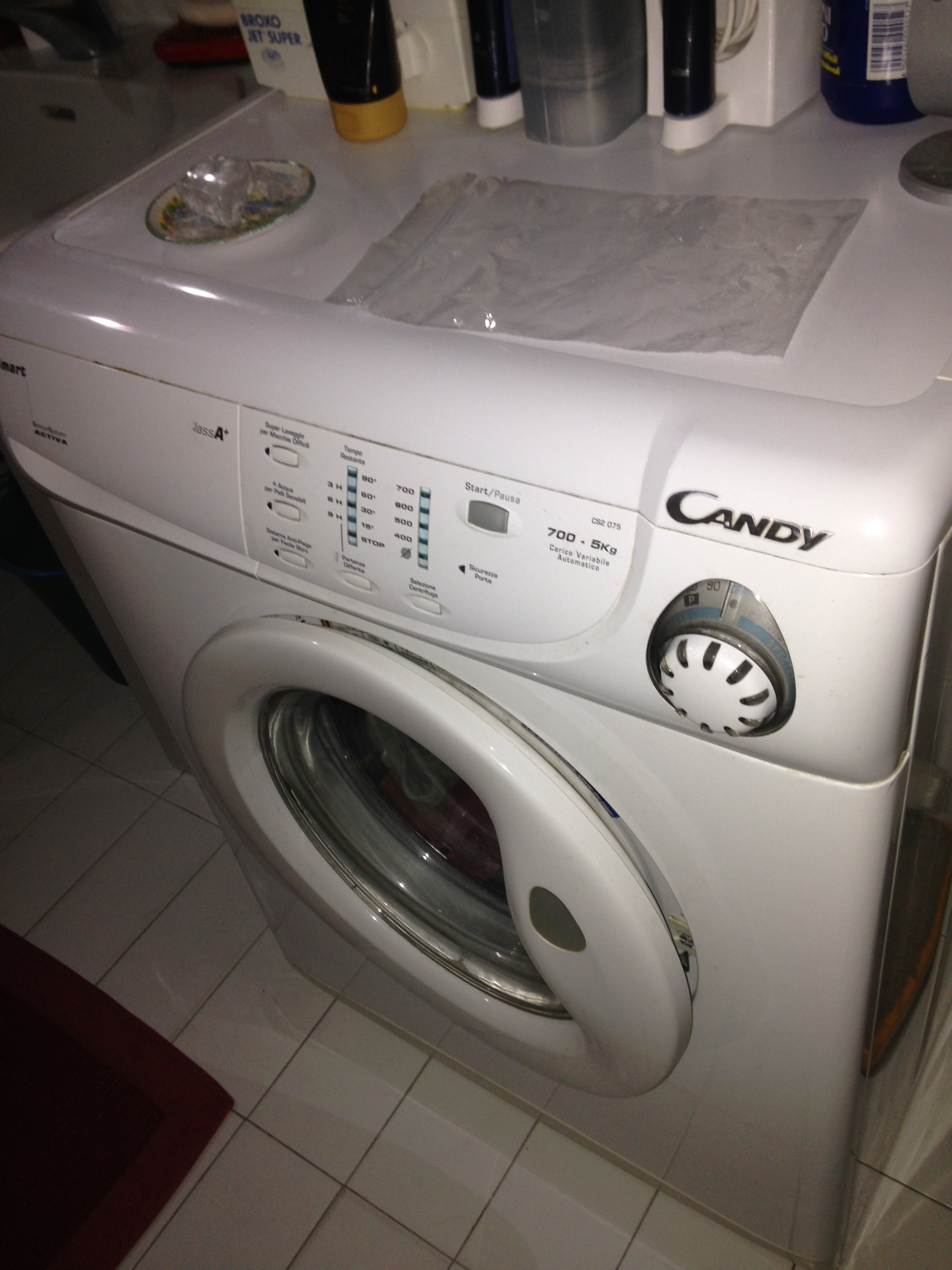
A Candy washing machine

Candy S.p.A. is an Italian multinational home appliances manufacturer based in Brugherio, Lombardy. Founded in 1927, Candy's appliances are better known through their continued marketing of the Hoover brand. Over 80% of sales are outside Italy.

Since 2018, it is a subsidiary of Haier.

== History ==
=== Early history ===
Back in 1945, the Eden Fumagalli Mechanical Workshop in Monza, manufacturers of precision machine instruments, designed the Model 50, the first all-Italian washing machine, which was launched officially at the Milan Trade Fair in 1946. In that same year, the Candy company was established.

The venture into household appliances began when Enzo, one of the three Fumagalli brothers, mailed from the United States, where he was a prisoner of war, rough drawings of a washing machine. His brother Niso, who had started the appliance operations with their father Eden, engineered the switch to the development and production of washing machines. Peppino, the younger brother, set up the administrative and management structure of the company.

In 1950, Candy moved into a new factory in Monza and launched the Bi-Matic, the first Italian semi-automatic washing machine. It was a great success, which opened the international markets; Candy thus became the first Italian appliance company to go abroad.

In the 1960s, the Automatic washing machine was launched: the first fully automatic one, designed and made in Italy. It had dampers, a thermostat, 550 rpm spin speed, and 10 programs.

In 1961, Candy moved to Brugherio, midway between Monza and Milano, where the new company headquarters and a large industrial site were completed, including the company's Research and Development laboratories.

In 1966, the Stipomatic was launched: an automatic dishwasher with two compartments; at the same time, the Superautomatic washing machine was launched. In those years, design became a strategic asset in product development: appliances were designed by key names such as Piero Geranzani, Joe Colombo, Marco Zanuso, Mario Bellini, and Giorgetto Giugiaro.

Genoa University awarded Niso Fumagalli an honoris causa degree in engineering in 1968, acknowledging his pivotal innovations in the washing machine and the many patents he held. The year before, Enzo Fumagalli died, however Candy continued to grow under the guidance of his brothers Peppino and Niso. The latter died in 1990.

Peppino Fumagalli was awarded the Cavaliere del Lavoro (Knight of Labour) honour by the President of the Italian Republic Giovanni Leone in 1973; He was appointed as CBE (Commander of the Order of the British Empire) in 1998. At the end of 2013, the structure of the Group was organised into three Business Sectors: washing appliances, kitchen appliances and small domestic appliances, with full responsibility on relevant product lines. The commercial organization has been split in three geographical areas: Europe, Russia, rest of the world, with strategic facilities in China and Turkey. With the completion of the acquisition program, the international presence of the Group has been consolidated, while R&D and innovation capabilities are centralized at the headquarters in Brugherio (MB), Italy.

On 9 March 2015 Peppino Fumagalli died. His son Beppe then became CEO of the company.

=== Acquisitions and sales ===
The growth strategy was built both on innovation and diversification of the product range, and by acquisitions. In 1971, Candy acquired Kelvinator, a specialist in refrigerators with a worldwide reach. In 1973, Candy reached a major milestone by expanding the portfolio of appliances through the acquisition of La Sovrana: cookers were added to the washing machine and dishwasher ranges. In 1980, Kelvinator UK was acquired, marking the beginning of international manufacturing.

In 1985, the Group acquired Zerowatt, producer of top-loading washing machines and dryers. This was followed by Gasfire, an Italian prestigious name in built-in cooking appliances. In 1987, came Rosières (company), a prestigious French brand, well known for its top-of-the-range built-in cooking appliances.

Kelvinator was sold by Candy to Electrolux AB in 1986.

In 1992, Candy acquired Mayc-Otsein of Spain, a specialist in top-loading washing machines. The following year saw the addition of Iberna in Italy, a well-known national brand in the cooling segment.

Hoover European Appliances Group was acquired in 1995 with exclusive rights on the brand name and products for the whole Mediterranean area, Europe and the ex-USSR territories. Hoover is today a European market leader in floor-care products.

Sixty years after the first washing machine, in 2005 the group acquired an established Russian washing machine brand, Vyatka, and its manufacturing site Vesta, in Kirov. The whole range of Candy and Hoover appliances is now marketed in Russia, alongside Vyatka washing machines.

In mid-2006, the Jinling brand was acquired in China, together with its industrial facilities, sales network, and international operations. The company is the country's third largest manufacturer of washing machines on Asian-type platforms (i.e., vertical axle), which Candy European-type models have been added to.

Early in 2007, the acquisition of Doruk with the brand Süsler in Turkey gave the Group an industrial site for cookers, hobs, ovens, both built-in and free-standing. In September 2007, an agreement was reached with Finland's Helkama Forste company for the acquisition of the exclusive rights on their Helkama and Grepa brands, marketed in the Nordic region, until the end of 2015.

In mid-2009 the 100 millionth appliance was produced since 1945, when the very first Candy washing machine was manufactured in the Fumagalli workshop. The 100 millionth appliance is a Candy GrandÓ 9 kg washing machine. In the same year, a new branch office was opened in Dubai to manage the development of the market in the Gulf area. The Hoover brand for small and large appliances made a comeback in Australia and New Zealand; thus the geographical coverage of the Group became close to global.

In 2013 the Candy Group completed the acquisition of the Baumatic brand in the UK. Baumatic is a well-known domestic appliances brand established in 1992 in the United Kingdom, specialising in built-in products, free-standing kitchen appliances and wine coolers.

Today, Candy's appliances are known more through their continued marketing of the Hoover and Kelvinator brands. Hoover-branded washing machines are largely Candy designs and are made up from Candy components. As well as in Europe, Candy operates manufacturing facilities in Iran. Candy has recently entered the smart home market with release of Candy Bianca, an app and voice-controlled machine.

On 28 September 2018, it was announced that the Chinese multinational Haier had acquired Candy for €475 million.

== Sports sponsorship ==
=== Formula One ===
As part of Candy's international expansion in the 1970s the company decided to sponsor a Formula One team. Midway through the 1979 season, Candy became the marquee sponsor for the Tyrrell team with drivers Jean-Pierre Jarier and Didier Pironi. Tyrrell enjoyed some success in 1979, finishing 5th in the Constructor's Championship, and Candy stayed on as the team's sponsor for the 1980 season. In 1981, Candy sponsored the Toleman team and was also later involved with Ligier but eventually withdrew from F1.

=== Liverpool F.C. ===
Candy were the shirt sponsor of English club Liverpool between 1988 and 1992, debuting in the 1988 FA Charity Shield which they won 2–1 against Wimbledon, and remembered as the sponsors when Liverpool won the league in 1990, and during the Hillsborough disaster of 1989. Candy last appeared on a Liverpool shirt on 9 May 1992, when they defeated Sunderland in the 1992 FA Cup Final, with Liverpool subsequently gaining a long-term sponsor in Carlsberg.

== See also ==
- List of Italian companies
