= GE Appliances =

Brand of appliance owned by Haier and KKR

- Trade name: GE Appliances
- Type: Subsidiary
- Industry: Manufacturing
- Predecessor: General Electric
- Founded: 1905; 121 years ago, in Schenectady, New York, U.S.
- Headquarters: Louisville, Kentucky, U.S.
- Area served: North America
- Key people: Kevin Nolan (president & CEO); Rick Hasselbeck (CCO)
- Products: Home appliances
- Number of employees: 12,000, including 6,000 at Appliance Park
- Parent: Haier Smart Home Company, a publicly-traded affiliate of Haier
- Website: geappliancesco.com

GE Appliances is an American home appliance manufacturer in Louisville, Kentucky owned by the Chinese multinational company Haier. As part of the acquisition deal from General Electric in 2016, Haier has the right to use the GE brand name on appliances until 2056.

GE Appliances is a major appliance manufacturer in the United States and manufactures appliances under several brands, including GE, GE Profile, Café, Monogram, Haier and Hotpoint (Americas only, European rights held by Whirlpool Corporation). The company also owns FirstBuild, a co-creation community and micro-factory on the University of Louisville's campus in Louisville, Kentucky. Another FirstBuild location is in South Korea, and a FirstBuild location in India opened its doors in 2019.

== History ==
GE Appliances was originally a part of General Electric, a company which began marketing a full roster of heating and cooking products in 1907. In January 2004, it became part of GE Consumer & Industrial when GE Consumer Products (founded in 1905) merged with GE Industrial Systems (founded in 1930) to form GE Consumer & Industrial. From 2010 to late 2014, GE Appliances & Lighting was a sub-business under GE Home & Business Solutions.

On September 8, 2014, General Electric agreed to sell the company to Electrolux, a Swedish appliance manufacturer and the second-largest consumer appliance manufacturer after Whirlpool Corporation, for US$3.3 billion in cash. The deal carried a US$175 million termination fee clause if Electrolux was unable to complete the acquisition. The transaction was terminated in December 2015 after the United States Department of Justice filed a lawsuit to block the deal on concerns that, along with Whirlpool, the combined company would control 90% of the "do-it-yourself" market for kitchen appliances sold by home construction retailers.

On June 6, 2016, Qingdao Haier (now Haier Smart Home Company) acquired GE Appliances for $5.6 billion. Under the terms of the sale, Haier has the right to use the GE brand name until 2056. In 2017, GE Appliances introduced a new tagline, 'good things, for life', referencing its historical connection with General Electric, which used the tagline "We Bring Good Things to Life" from 1979 to 2003.

== GE Appliance Park ==
In 1951, construction began in Louisville, Kentucky, on Appliance Park, the now 750-acre (300-ha) manufacturing facility that employs 8,100 people.

=== 2015 fire ===
A large-scale fire broke out on April 3, 2015, at the Appliance Park. Building 6 (AP6) partially collapsed and was predicted to be a total loss. The 6-acre (24,000 m^{2}) building, located at 4000 Buechel Bank Road, was mostly being used for storage, with portions leased to GE suppliers and logistics partners. More than 200 firefighters from 18 local agencies were involved in fighting the eight-alarm fire, which led to a production halt and evacuation of the other buildings in the complex. No injuries or fatalities were reported, but "shelter in place" orders were issued for homes and businesses within a 2-mile (3.2 km) radius (later reduced to a one-half mile radius) of the Appliance Park due to noxious and acrid smoke. No hazardous materials were known to be stored at the site. Because of the huge volume of smoke, gases and runoff from burning plastics and other materials the Kentucky Department of Environmental Protection and USEPA were called in to monitor emissions from the fire and found they were not toxic. However, area residents reported leaf-size pieces of ash and burned insulation materials in their yards. The cause of the fire remained unclear; a local fire chief said that investigators were leaning toward a lightning strike as the probable cause.

The fire was contained, but not extinguished, by the early afternoon of April 3. A statement issued by GE later that day indicated that production at the complex would remain halted over the weekend and at least through the end of the following week as the company conducted "a thorough evaluation of all other buildings" and replenished inventories of parts destroyed by the fire. The shelter-in-place order was canceled for residents within one-half mile of the site the following Sunday, April 5.

Two years following the fire, an employee-led company initiative turned the site into a sustainable green space that contains native grasses, trees, and wildlife.

== Manufacturing facilities and investments ==
GE Appliances' largest manufacturing site, Appliance Park facility in Louisville, Kentucky, produces washing machines, dryers, dishwashers, and bottom-freezer refrigerators. The company also operates manufacturing sites in four states including Decatur, Alabama – which produces top freezer refrigerators; LaFayette, Georgia – cooking products; Selmer, Tennessee – Monogram built-in refrigerators and Zoneline PTACs, and Camden, South Carolina – water heating products. The facilities in LaFayette and Selmer are owned by the company. The company also produces small appliances through small-batch manufacturing at its microfactories, including FirstBuild in Kentucky and CoCREATE in Connecticut. GE also formerly operated a facility in Bloomington, Indiana.

GE Appliances manufacturing facilities in the United States
Name	Location	Products	Operated	Notes / Refs.
Appliance Park	Louisville, Kentucky	top-load washing machines; front-load dryers; dishwashers; bottom-freezer refrigerators	1953–present	
Decatur plant	Decatur, Alabama	top-freezer refrigerators	1977–present	
LaFayette plant	LaFayette, Georgia	gas ranges; electric ranges; cooktops; wall ovens	1973–present	
Selmer plant	Selmer, Tennessee	built-in refrigerators; PTACs	1986–present	
Camden plant	Camden, South Carolina	water heaters	2000–present	Former Haier plant Become a GE plant in 2022.

Since 2016, GE Appliances has launched new businesses and added U.S. investments. The company announced it would make major investments in its U.S. facilities including $200 million into Appliance Park in Louisville, $150 million investment in new distribution centers in Dallas, Denver, Northern Georgia, Northern California, and $115 million in its manufacturing facility in Decatur, Alabama.

In 2020, the company announced it would expand beyond major household goods and begin producing small appliances, including coffee makers, toasters, toaster ovens, and blenders.

In July 2022, GE Appliances created a dedicated team for the recreational living sector, expanding its RV-focused product innovations. Based in Elkhart, Indiana, GE Appliances Recreational Living produces products for motorhomes and campers.

In the same year, GE Appliances launched an Air & Water Solutions division focused on residential and light commercial water heaters, water filtration, HVAC, and ductless heating and cooling solutions. In 2022, the company made a $70 million investment to build gas water heaters in Camden, South Carolina.

In March 2023, GE Appliances co-founded the Home Connectivity Alliance to support interoperability among various smart home devices. In July, the company marked 50 years of building cooking products at its Roper subsidiary in Georgia by investing $118 million in new assembly lines, presses, and workforce programs.

In October 2023, GE Appliances announced two new dishwasher manufacturing lines that completed a $450 million investment announced at Appliance Park in late 2021. In the same month, GE Appliances officially opened its CoCREATE facility in Stamford, Connecticut. This location offers a space for local entrepreneurs, students, and community members to work with GE Appliances on prototype development and small-batch manufacturing. It features a small appliance microfactory, community makerspace, test kitchen, and design center.

In February 2024, the company introduced the EcoBalance Home System, a platform enabling homeowners to monitor and manage energy usage across home systems.

In August 2025, GE Appliances announced their plan invest more than $3 billion over the next five years in its U.S. operations. Inititatives have included commencing production of their own water filters and sourcing of semiconductors from Texas Instruments, including supplying a third of the microchips needed for production of appliances at its facility in Louisville.

In August 2026, GE Appliances announced an increase in its US supply chain, with sourcing of semiconductors from Texas Instruments (TI), with its U.S. based fabrication facilities, which will include microcontrollers, Wi-Fi connectivity solutions, and analog components into its next generation of connected appliances, supplying one-third of the chips for products made in its GE Appliances’ plant in Louisville. Production is expected to begin in 2027. This is part of its $3 billion U.S.investment plan first announced in August 2025.

In September 2026, GE Appliances announced that it will invest $1 billion at Appliance Park. A major component is bringing dryer production from Mexico back to Louisville. The investment is expected to help secure approximately 4,700 production jobs. GE Appliance Park is set to become the largest home appliance manufacturing site in the U.S.

== Awards and recognition ==
In 2023, Time included the GE Profile Smart Mixer in its list of Best Inventions. In 2024, TIME also recognized the GE Profile Smart Indoor Smoker on this list.

In February 2023, the newly released GE Profile UltraFast Combo with ventless heat pump technology, a washer-dryer appliance, was recognized with the KBIS Editors' Choice Award.

In 2024, Fast Company named GE Appliances among the "Most Innovative Companies".

== See also ==
- List of major employers in Louisville, Kentucky
