= Zhang Ruimin =

Chinese businessman (born 1949)

- 张瑞敏
- Born: 5 January 1949 (age 77); Laizhou, Shandong, China
- Education: Master's
- Alma mater: University of Science and Technology of China
- Occupation: Businessman
- Title: Chairman of the Board and CEO, Haier Group
- Political party: Chinese Communist Party
- Honours: First Chinese business leader to speak at Harvard

Zhang Ruimin (Chinese: 张瑞敏; born 5 January 1949) is a Chinese business executive who founded Haier Group and served as its chairman and chief executive officer from 1984 until 2021. Under Zhang's leadership, Haier grew from an insolvent Qingdao refrigerator factory into one of the world's largest home appliance manufacturers, reporting over 300 billion yuan in revenue in 2020.

Zhang was appointed the director of Qingdao Refrigerator Factory, predecessor of Haier Group, in December 1984. In 1988, under his leadership, Haier won the first national gold medal for quality in China's refrigerator industry history.

Zhang Ruimin transformed Haier from a small, failing collective factory, to an Internet of Things (IoT) ecosystem brand.

In 1998, Zhang Ruimin spoke at Harvard University, becoming the first Chinese business leader to appear on the Harvard podium. He has received management attention and praise at home and abroad for his continuous management model innovations. He created the Rendanheyi model – which encompasses management thinking and models with Chinese characteristics for universal application. Gary Hamel described him as "a CEO representative of the Internet era".

== Early life ==
Zhang Ruimin was born on 5 January 1949, to a working class family in Qingdao, Shandong; his parents were employed in a local garment factory. As a youth, Zhang joined the Red Guards, visited Mao's birthplace, and attended rallies in Beijing since all schools had been closed, and when the movement was finally disbanded, he was able to avoid being sent down to the countryside.

Zhang Ruimin studied at the University of Science and Technology of China where he graduated with a master's degree in business administration. He has studied extensively about western management theories and has taken several courses on the subject.

== Career ==
=== Early years ===
In 1984, Zhang was appointed general manager of the Qingdao Refrigerator Plant, predecessor of Haier Group, a company that was insolvent and going bankrupt.

In 1985, in order to raise employees' awareness about quality and increase their support of the brand-building strategy, Zhang Ruimin took the lead in smashing 76 defective refrigerators. It was a watermark event that pushed Haier to become a household name. Early in his tenure as general manager, Zhang traveled to Germany to visit the company's German partner, from whom they were purchasing technology and know-how. He quickly realized that the company had a serious problem in terms of reputation and quality; it also reflected poorly upon his country. To ingrain the concept of quality into his workers, Zhang decided to conduct a demonstration with some of the factory's product.

The next year, its refrigerators sold well in major domestic markets such as Beijing and Tianjin, according to the state-run People's Daily. Zhang also instituted many reforms that were completely novel to the state-run Chinese economy at the time. To encourage productivity, Zhang tied employee pay scales to sales of the products which they produced. He also instituted a practice whereby a mistake by an employee would require that employee to stand before his co-workers to explain his error. Another new concept that Zhang introduced was customer feedback. After noticing that sales were poor in Sichuan province, he discovered the reason to be that villagers would use the machines to wash sweet potatoes, clogging the drains in the washers. In response, Zhang had his company redesign the product to wash produce in addition to clothing.

=== Haier Group ===
In December 1991, Zhang Ruimin established Haier Group and became its president. At the same time, Haier started diversification under his leadership.

During the period 1991–1998, Zhang Ruimin pursued mergers and acquisitions as well as industrial park developments. Haier acquired a number of targets in washers, TVs, and air conditioners, and some of these targets had different ownership structures.

In July 1995, the Qingdao municipal government decided to transfer all of Red Star Electric Appliances' shares to Haier Group. Red Star was originally similar to the former Haier, a major city-level enterprise in Qingdao, but due to poor management, even while Haier rose to the top brand of home appliances in China, Red Star bled a loss of more than RMB100 million and became insolvent.

The turnaround story was later the subject of a Harvard Business School case study, and Zhang was subsequently invited to speak at Harvard Business School in 1998.

In 1999, Zhang Ruimin became chairman of the Board of Haier Group. In the same year, Zhang Ruimin invested US$30 million to build the Haier Industrial Park in South Carolina, USA in an effort to produce home appliances locally. In this seven-year stage, Haier established 18 manufacturing plants, 17 distribution centers, and 9 R&D centers, underpinned by a three-pronged strategy of R&D, production, and distribution.

Zhang began a concerted effort to expand Haier's presence abroad, beginning in Europe, where Haier already had connections thanks to its partnership with Liebherr. In 1993, the company also began shipping its products to the Middle East and Africa, and entered South East Asia in 1996. To break into the American market, Zhang realized that Haier would need to offer niche products such as wine coolers and mini-refrigerators, popular with hotels and college dormitories. To achieve this, Haier dissected its 80,000 workers into hundreds of internal micro companies, each with a profit and loss account. Haier adopted a policy of "catfish management" whereby each division manager has a shadow manager who is ready to take charge of the division if, for whatever reason, the manager misses targets for three months. By the turn of the century Haier claimed up to 60 percent of the electric wine cooler market. Haier also open a manufacturing plant in Camden, South Carolina that produced full-sized refrigerators. Factories were also opened in Indonesia, the Philippines, Pakistan, and Jordan. By 2005, revenues at Haier had surpassed $12 billion and the company employed over 30,000 people; the Financial Times recognized Zhang Ruimin as one of the "50 most respected business leaders in the world."

While a price war was ongoing in the home appliances industry in the period 2005–2012, Zhang Ruimin adopted the strategy of production on demand for zero inventory. During this period, Haier underwent a significant transformation from organization-centric to user-centric and from a manufacturing organization to a service organization.

In May 2000, Zhang Ruimin attended the 30th World Economic Forum. While there, he was invited to speak at the International Institute for Management Development (IMD) in Lausanne, Switzerland.

In 2002, C.E.O., a film based on the life story of Zhang Ruimin and co-produced by China Film Group and Shandong Film Studio, premiered.

On 18 October 2011, under Zhang Ruimin's leadership, Haier Group acquired the white goods businesses of Sanyo Electric in Japan and Southeast Asia.

Following the completion in December 2012 of Haier's acquisition of Fisher & Paykel, the largest home appliances brand in New Zealand, the Fisher & Paykel New Zealand R&D Center (Dunedin and Auckland) became one of Haier's five R&D centers globally.

On 26 December 2012, Haier's 28th anniversary, Zhang Ruimin announced that Haier had entered a new strategy stage with a networking theme.Zhang Ruimin's 1994 text Haier Is the Sea helped establish a "sea culture" that guided Haier's organizational transformations for over twenty years.

In 2015, he was included in the 2015 Thinkers50 Rankings and received the Thinkers50 2015 Ideas into Practice Award.

Haier invested in the construction of an industrial park in Pune, Maharashtra, India, in November 2017. Five connected plants were built in the industrial park for refrigerators, washers, air conditioners, water heaters, and color TVs. When the industrial park is fully operational, its annual output will reach 3.8 million units, and its product categories will add washers, air conditioners, water heaters, and TVs to refrigerators.

On 25 October 2019, Qingdao Haier Biomedical Company Limited (stock name: Haier Biomedical and ticker number: 688139) became the first Qingdao-based company to list on the Star Board. It started trading on the Star Board of the Shanghai Stock Exchange, with a total of 79,267,900 shares issued at RMB 15.53/share. The successful IPO of Haier Biomedical is a microcosm of Haier's self-driven transformation in the IoT era. Jiang Qiping, an IoT researcher and director of the CASS Information Research Center, calls Haier Biomedical's IPO a significant precursor to a "period of fast growth" of IoT enterprises in China.

In October 2019, Zhang Ruimin was honored with the Forbes China Lifetime Achievement Award.

In Novenber 2021, Zhang to Step Down as Chairman.

=== Politics ===
Zhang Ruimin joined the Chinese Communist Party in 1976.

In 2002, Zhang became a member of the 16th Central Committee of the Chinese Communist Party.

== Awards and honors ==
- Entrepreneur of the Year (1997), Asia Weekly
- First Chinese business leader to speak on the Harvard podium (1998)
- Financial Times' Global 30 Most Respected Entrepreneurs (1999)
- 2001 CCTV China Economic Personality of the Year
- Financial Times' Global Top 50 Most Respected Business Leaders (2005)
- Forbes China Philanthropy List (2009)
- China's Most Powerful People (2009), BusinessWeek
- Dale Carnegie Global Leadership Award (2012)

== Published works ==
=== Films ===
- C.E.O. (2002 film) directed by Wu Tianming

=== Biographies ===
- Yong, Hu. Thus Spoke Zhang Ruimin
- Yong, Hu. Zhang Ruimin’s Management Journal (Management Journal of Famous Chinese Business Leaders Series)

=== Manga ===
- A Challenge of China’s No. 1 CEO
