= Packaged terminal air conditioner =

Wall-mounted air conditioning system

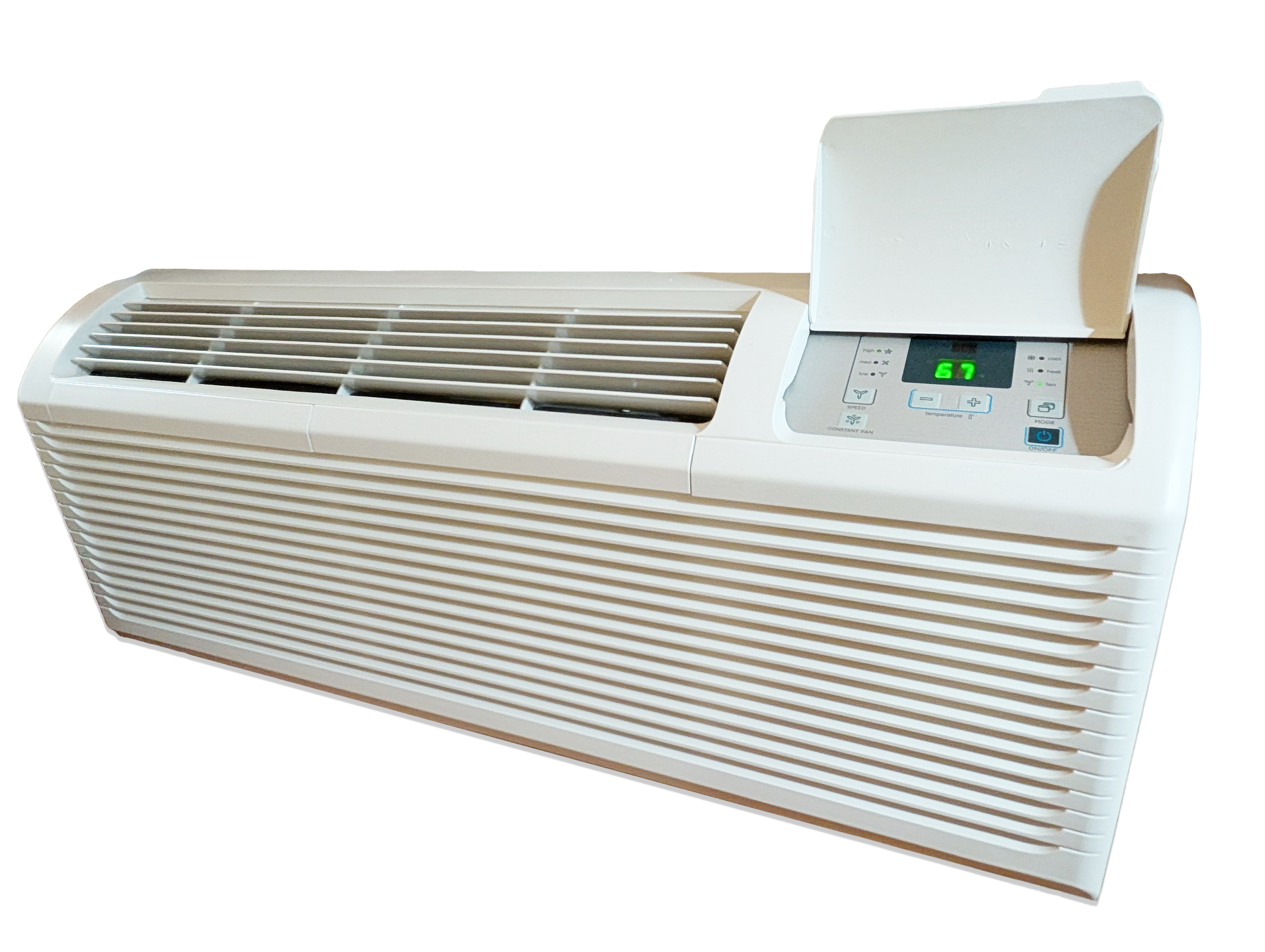
- Type: Appliance
- Inventor: Chrysler Motors
- Inception: 1935; 91 years ago
- Manufacturer: Various
- Available: Globally

A packaged terminal air conditioner (PTAC) is a type of self-contained heating and air conditioning system intended to be mounted through a wall. The first practical semi-portable air conditioning unit was invented by engineers at Chrysler Motors. It entered the market in 1935, and was designed to fit under a window like many modern PTACs.

PTACs are commonly found in commercial settings (hotels, motels, hospitals), or multifamily facilities (senior housing, condominiums, apartment buildings). While PTACs are mostly used to cool individual living spaces, there are units that offer resistance heating and/or space heating via heat pumps. The latter are more properly described as packaged terminal heat pumps (PTHP). PTACs with support for external heating through a hydronic heating coil or natural gas heating also exist. Typical PTAC heating and cooling capacity values range from 7,000–19,000 BTU/h (2 to 5.5 kilowatts) nominal.

PTACs are commonly installed in window walls and masonry walls, with multiple standard dimensions available including 42×16 inches (1067x406 mm), 36x15 inches, and 40x15 inches. Their installation typically requires the following:

- Louvers
- Metal sleeve
- Heating coil
- The PTAC itself
- Room enclosure

Since it is installed on the window, insulating the gap can improve its efficiency. Some models have the ability, if the control board is so equipped, to add a internet or remote thermostat. This functionality relies on a RF link.

Top 5 PTAC Manufacturers of the 2020s (by volume)
| Manufacturer | Entry Price Point | Remote Thermostat Compatibility | Electrical Requirements | Primary Market Segment |
|---|---|---|---|---|
| Amana | $750 – $900 | Yes (7-pin standard wire harness & wireless RF options) | 208/240V or 265/277V; 15A, 20A, or 30A circuits | Commercial (Hospitality) & Multi-family Residential |
| GE Appliances (Zoneline) | $800 – $950 | Yes (Integrated low-voltage terminal blocks & central EMS) | 208/240V or 265/277V; 15A, 20A, or 30A circuits | Commercial (Hotels/Healthcare) & Light Residential |
| Friedrich | $950 – $1,150 | Yes (Supports standard 24V wall thermostats & smart building EMS) | 208/240V or 265/277V; 15A, 20A, or 30A circuits | Premium Commercial & High-End Residential |
| Carrier | $850 – $1,000 | Yes (Universal 24V remote thermostat connections) | 208/240V or 265/277V; 15A, 20A, or 30A circuits | Commercial, Institutional & Residential |
| LG | $800 – $950 | Yes (24V wall thermostat connections & LG ThinQ/wireless kits) | 208/240V or 265/277V; 15A, 20A, or 30A circuits | Commercial & Modern Residential Apartments |
