= GE Bloomington plant =

- Built: 1961
- Operated: 1967–2016
- Location: 301 North Curry Pike; Bloomington, Indiana, United States
- Coordinates: 39°10′10″N 86°35′6″W
- Industry: Home appliances
- Products: side-by-side refrigerators
- Employees: 1,075 (2001)
- Area: 65 acres (26 ha)
- Volume: 1,000,000 square feet (93,000 m^{2})
- Owner: General Electric

GE Bloomington plant was an appliance manufacturing plant in Bloomington, Indiana, owned by General Electric. GE produced 20,801,166 side-by-side refrigerators in its Bloomington refrigerator plant. The 1 millionth unit was produced in 1974, with the 10 millionth in 1995.

== History ==
The plant was built by Franklin Manufacturing in 1961. GE subsequently purchased the facility in 1966 and produced the first side-by-side refrigerator there in 1967.

In September 1999, GE announced that it will lay off 1,400 of its 3,200 workers at its Bloomington, Indiana refrigerator plant and will shift a portion of production to a new, $250 million facility in Celaya, Mexico, with cuts occurring through 2001, partly due to cost pressures and potential production shifts. By early 2001, just before the June layoffs, approximately 1,800 workers remained at the facility.

In June 2001, approximately 920 workers lost their jobs at the Bloomington GE refrigerator plant, to cut labor costs from roughly $24 an hour to $2 an hour, as part of a move to shift production to Mexico. After the layoffs, company officials stated that approximately 1,075 workers would continue to be employed at the Bloomington plant.

In July 2004, GE announced it would lay off 525 employees at the plant by the end of March 2005, reducing the workforce from over 1,600 down to approximately 1,125 employees. The company announced on January 17, 2008, that it will close the 900-worker facility; the decision was reversed in 2009 after the union negotiated concessions and the company qualified for energy-efficiency tax credits.

In early September 2013, GE announced it would cut 160 jobs at the plant, reducing the workforce from 522 to approximately 364 by the end of October.

On August 26, 2016, GE Appliances closed its side-by-side refrigerator manufacturing facility in Bloomington, Indiana due to declining demand, affecting over 300 employees at the time of its closure.

== See also ==
- RCA television plant (Bloomington, Indiana), another plant owned by General Electric from 1986 to 1988
