= Haer, Jalandhar =

Haer
- Village
- Location in Punjab, India Haer (India)
- Coordinates: 31.1703605°N 75.4365604°E
- Country: India
- State: Punjab
- District: Jalandhar
- Tehsil: Nakodar

Government
  - Type: Panchayat raj
  - Body: Gram panchayat
- Elevation: 240 m (790 ft)

Population (2011)
  - Total: 2,213
- Sex ratio 1095/1118 ♂/♀

Languages
  - Official: Punjabi
- Time zone: UTC+5:30 (IST)
- PIN: 144630
- Telephone: 01821
- ISO 3166 code: IN-PB
- Vehicle registration: PB- 08
- Website: jalandhar.nic.in

Haer is a village in Nakodar in Jalandhar district of Punjab State, India. It is located 8 km from Nakodar, 31 km from Kapurthala, 22 km from district headquarter Jalandhar and 164 km from state capital Chandigarh. The village is administered by a sarpanch who is an elected representative of village as per Panchayati raj (India).

== Transport ==
Nakodar railway station is the nearest train station. The village is 70 km away from domestic airport in Ludhiana and the nearest international airport is located in Chandigarh also Sri Guru Ram Dass Jee International Airport is the second nearest airport which is 111 km away in Amritsar.
