= GE Appliance Park =

Manufacturing complex in Louisville, Kentucky, U.S.

- Built: 1951–1953
- Operated: 1953–present
- Location: 4000 Buechel Bank Road; Louisville, Kentucky, United States
- Coordinates: 38°10′6″N 85°39′0″W
- Industry: Home appliances
- Products: top-load washing machines; front-load dryers; dishwashers; bottom-freezer refrigerators
- Employees: 8,100
- Area: 750 acres (300 ha)
- Owner: General Electric

GE Appliance Park is a General Electric manufacturing complex in Louisville, Kentucky, owned by GE Appliances, a subsidiary of Haier, formerly a division of General Electric. The facility was GE Appliances' largest manufacturing site, producing top-load washing machines, front-load dryers, dishwashers, and bottom-freezer refrigerators. In 2018, the company announced it would make a major, $200 million investment into Appliance Park.

== History ==
=== 1950–1984: Early years and growth ===
In 1950, General Electric purchased the original plot of a 900-plus acre site of farmland for its six-building Appliance Park complex. One year later in July 1951, General Electric began construction of its Appliance Park manufacturing plant in Louisville, Kentucky on a 900-plus acre site.

On February 6, 1953, the facility began shipping its first appliance product, a carload of 90 automatic dryers bound for Texas, followed by washers, dishwashers and electric ranges later that year. Building 1 (AP1) was dedicated to laundry appliances, while other buildings (AP2 and AP3) focused on ranges and dishwashers. By November 1953, employment reached 4,315, and the facility was equipped with 45 miles of conveyors.

In 1954, the facility became the first private U.S. business to install a 30-ton UNIVAC I computer. The $1.2 million machine, which occupied a large room and contained over 5,000 vacuum tubes, was primarily used for payroll and production scheduling.

On October 25 of the same year, refrigerator production began at the Appliance Park facility in Building 5. By March 1955, employment at the complex reached 9,500. By 1957, the facility employed 16,000 workers, had assembled its 2 millionth laundry appliance.

The park's R&D center was completed in 1971, which included 182,000 square feet of laboratories, and a 5,000-volume technical library, and by the mid-70s, the company was a major force in six industry segments. By 1972, the 1,000 acres (400 ha) park was a "city within a city," producing over 60,000 major appliances a week, and has around 23,000 employees. Today, the 750-acre (300-ha) manufacturing plant employed 8,100 people.

=== 1984–2010: Decline ===
By 1984, employment at the park had dropped to 13,500 workers due to automation and contraction, slipping below 1950s levels.

In the early 1990s, CEO Jack Welch suggested the facility could be closed by 2003. In response to the threat, the local union and management developed a 53-point "Save The Park" plan, which, along with subsequent negotiations, convinced Welch to keep the facility open. In 1999, the GE Appliance Park in Louisville, Kentucky has approximately 4,200 employees, dropped from its peak of over 23,000 employees in the 1970s.

In 2000, the facility stopped producing ranges in Building 2, as GE shifted the production of ranges from Louisville to Roper Corporation in LaFayette, Georgia. In 2005, the park was dropped to 2,300 employees. To combat this decline, Local 761 of the IUE-CWA union agreed to lower wages for new hires to help keep jobs in Louisville.

=== 2010–present: Reshoring ===
In 2010, GE initiated a $600 million investment at Appliance Park to overhaul production, introducing new lines like the GeoSpring hybrid water heater and redesigned laundry/dishwasher products. At the time, the park employed approximately 3,600 people, producing over 3 million appliances per year.

In August 2011, GE unveiled a Platinum-LEED certified data center at Building 4, which is the Information Technology headquarters for GE Appliances and Lighting. In 2012, the GE Appliance Park significantly expanded its manufacturing capabilities, focusing on new high-efficiency, top-load washing machines, and a new line of French door refrigerators, creating about 750 jobs.

In April 2013, GE began producing its first U.S.-made front-load washers and matching dryers at Building 1 of its Appliance Park manufacturing plant. The RightHeight project, featuring high-efficiency models with built-in risers, was part of a $100 million+ investment that added 200 jobs, marking a significant expansion of domestic laundry manufacturing.

In October 2015, GE Appliances announced a $40 million investment to bring Zoneline PTAC production back from overseas to the facility, creating about 75 new jobs, previously, Zoneline units was manufactured at the park from 1961 to 1987. Full production of the new Zoneline units began in the first quarter of 2016. In August 2017, just over a year after starting production, GE Appliances moved Zoneline production out of Louisville to Selmer, Tennessee to make room for an on-site supplier distribution center.

In 2025, GE Appliances announced a $490 million investment to reshore production of high-efficiency, front-load washers and the GE Profile UltraFast Combo from China to its Appliance Park in Louisville, Kentucky. This initiative, creating 800 new jobs, focuses on producing advanced laundry products in Building 2. Production of over 15 models is shifting to this site, enhancing its capacity to manufacture top-load washers and front-load dryers.

In January 2026, GE Appliances announced the start of its first-ever in-house water filter manufacturing operation, producing millions of water filters annually at Appliance Park. The company emphasized this marks their ongoing commitment to U.S. manufacturing, and represents another project stemming from GE Appliances' previous $3 billion investment plan in the U.S.

== 2015 fire ==
A large-scale fire broke out on April 3, 2015, at the Appliance Park. Building 6 (AP6) partially collapsed and was predicted to be a total loss. The 6-acre (24,000 m^{2}) building, located at 4000 Buechel Bank Road, was mostly being used for storage, with portions leased to GE suppliers and logistics partners. More than 200 firefighters from 18 local agencies were involved in fighting the eight-alarm fire, which led to a production halt and evacuation of the other buildings in the complex. No injuries or fatalities were reported, but "shelter in place" orders were issued for homes and businesses within a 2-mile (3.2 km) radius (later reduced to a one-half mile radius) of the Appliance Park due to noxious and acrid smoke. No hazardous materials were known to be stored at the site. Because of the huge volume of smoke, gases and runoff from burning plastics and other materials the Kentucky Department of Environmental Protection and USEPA were called in to monitor emissions from the fire and found they were not toxic. However, area residents reported leaf-size pieces of ash and burned insulation materials in their yards. The cause of the fire remained unclear; a local fire chief said that investigators were leaning toward a lightning strike as the probable cause.

The fire was contained, but not extinguished, by the early afternoon of April 3. A statement issued by GE later that day indicated that production at the complex would remain halted over the weekend and at least through the end of the following week as the company conducted "a thorough evaluation of all other buildings" and replenished inventories of parts destroyed by the fire. The shelter-in-place order was canceled for residents within one-half mile of the site the following Sunday, April 5.

Two years following the fire, an employee-led company initiative turned the site into a sustainable green space that contains native grasses, trees, and wildlife.
