= Haier =

Chinese consumer electronics and appliance company

Haier Group Corporation

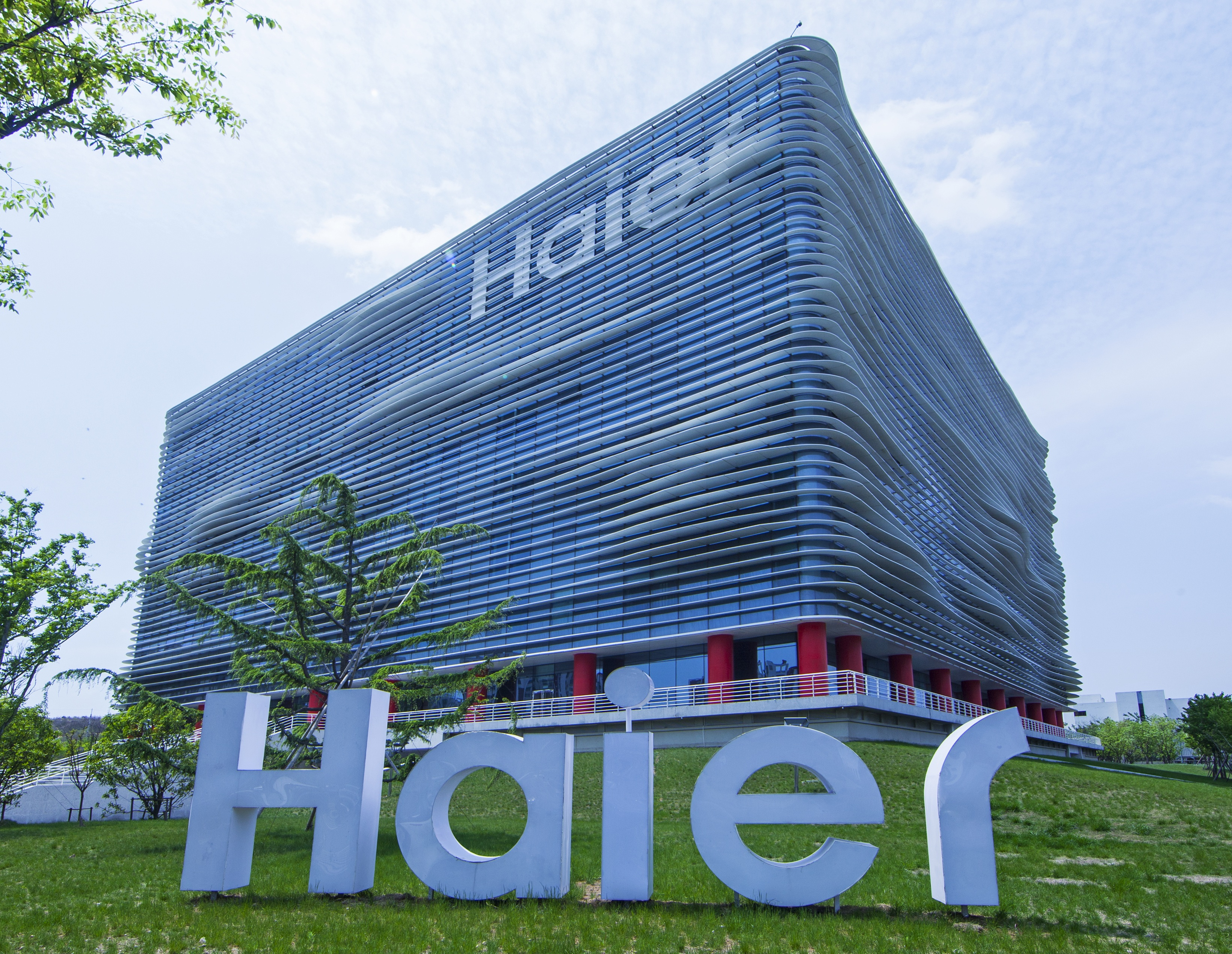
- Headquarters in Qingdao, Shandong
- Native name: 海尔集团公司
- Type: Public
- Traded as: SSE: 600690; SEHK: 6690; FWB: 690D; Dow Jones China 88 Index component CSI A100
- Industry: Home appliances; Consumer electronics
- Founded: 28 April 1984; 42 years ago
- Founder: Zhang Ruimin
- Headquarters: Qingdao, Shandong, China
- Area served: Worldwide
- Key people: Zhang Ruimin (chairman & CEO); Liang Haishan (rotating president); Zhou Yunjie (rotating president)
- Products: Major appliances Small appliances; Commercial heating and cooling systems; Consumer electronics
- Revenue: ▲CN¥227.5 billion (2021) (Haier Smart Home)
- Operating income: ▲CN¥15.91 billion (2021) (Haier Smart Home)
- Net income: ▲CN¥13.21 billion (2021) (Haier Smart Home)
- Total assets: ▲CN¥217.5 billion (2021) (Haier Smart Home)
- Total equity: ▲CN¥81.0 billion (2021) (Haier Smart Home)
- Number of employees: 109,586 (2021) (Haier Smart Home)
- Subsidiaries: Haier Smart Home Company (35%), owner of GE Appliances (U.S.); Hotpoint (U.S.); Hoover (Europe); Candy; Fisher & Paykel; Evo (Russia); Thunderobot
- Website: haier.com

Haier
- Simplified Chinese: 海尔
- Traditional Chinese: 海爾
Transcriptions
Standard Mandarin
- Hanyu Pinyin: Hǎi'ěr

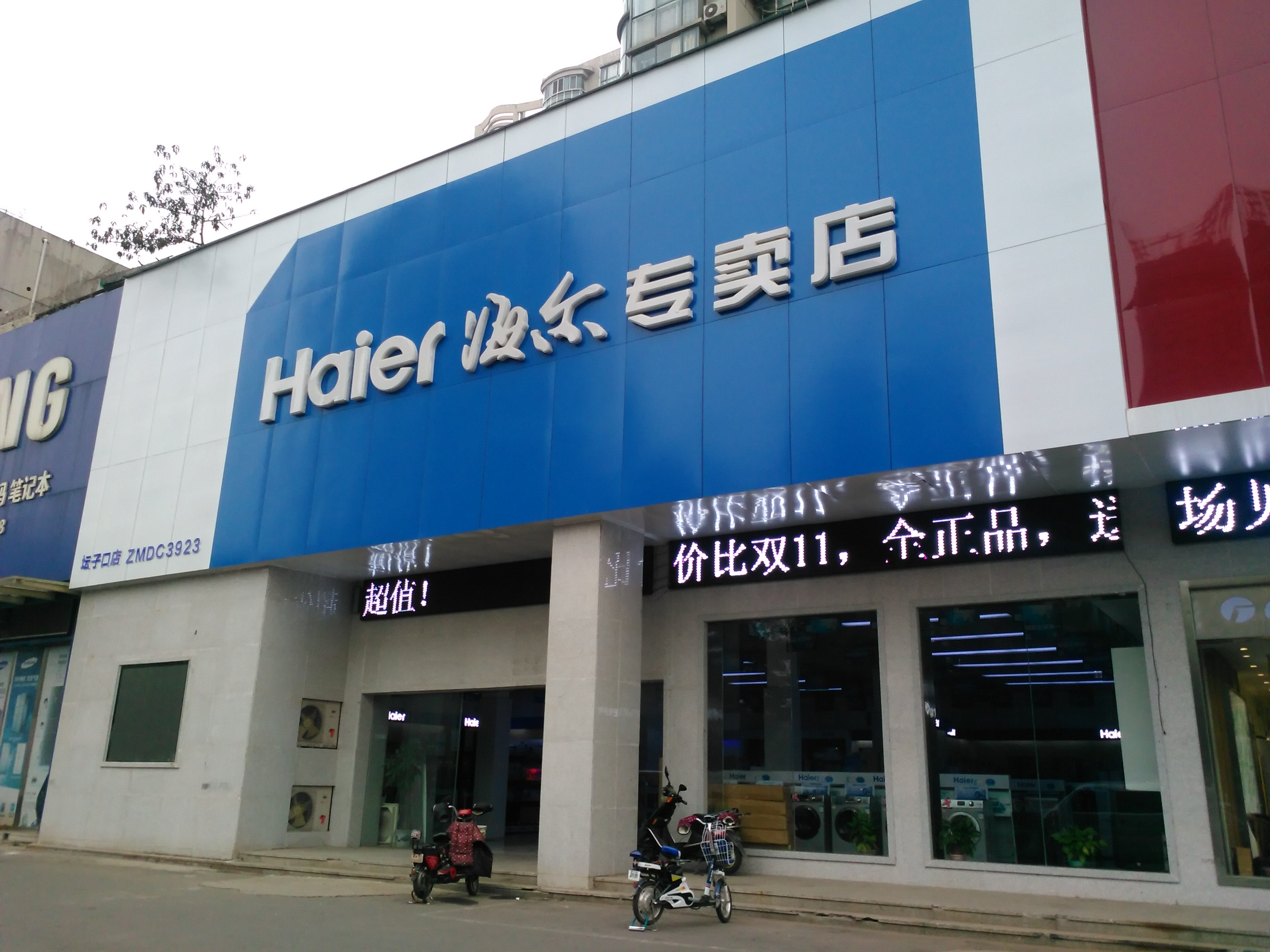
Haier store in Nanchang

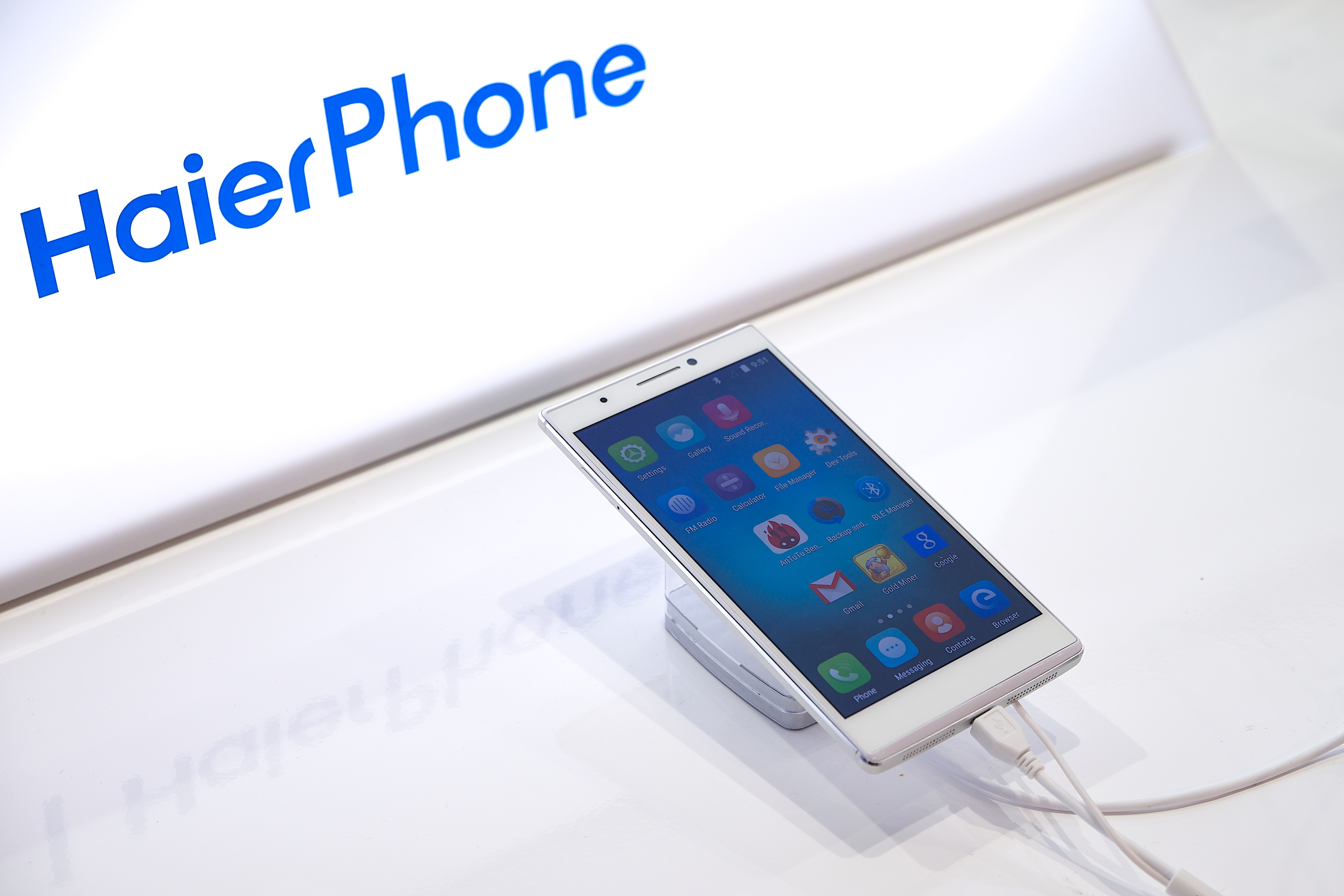
A Haier smartphone at the Mobile World Congress 2015

Haier Group Corporation (/ˈhaɪ.ər/) is a Chinese multinational home appliances and consumer electronics company headquartered in Qingdao, Shandong. Its Haier Smart Home Company affiliate, of which it owns 35%, designs, develops, manufactures and sells home appliances including refrigerators, air conditioners, washing machines, dryers, and microwave ovens under the brand names Haier, Casarte, Leader, GE Appliances, Fisher & Paykel, Aqua, Candy and Evo. Its Haier Electronics Group affiliate manufactures consumer electronics such as mobile phones, computers, and televisions. Its ThundeRobot brand, founded in 2014, is focused on gaming computers and accessories. Haier Smart Home Company is ranked 407th on the Fortune 500.

In 2004, Haier ranked 95th on World Brand Lab's World's Top 100 Most Influential Brands, making it the only Chinese brand on the list. Haier has been one of The World's 500 Most Influential Brands by the World Brand Lab for 21 consecutive years. According to Euromonitor International, Haier ranked first globally in sales volume of major appliances from 2009 to 2018. In 2019, BrandZ ranked Haier as the most valuable brand in the IoT ecosystem category, with a brand value of $16.3 billion.

Haier Group has two publicly traded affiliates that trade on three stock exchanges: Haier Smart Home (海尔智家) (SSE: 600690 as well as "D-share" listing of Haier Smart Home in China Europe International Exchange of Frankfurt; ex-Qingdao Haier Co., Ltd.) and Haier Electronics Group Co., Ltd. (SEHK: 1169). In 1993, it listed its Qingdao Haier Refrigerator Co. subsidiary on the Shanghai Stock Exchange, raising CN¥370 million. In 2005, Haier entered the Hong Kong Stock Exchange through a "backdoor listing" by acquiring a controlling stake in a publicly listed joint venture Haier-CCT Holdings Ltd. (SEHK: 1169).

== History ==
The origins of Haier date back to a refrigerator factory built in Qingdao to supply the Chinese market in the 1920s. After the 1949 establishment of the People's Republic of China, the factory was then taken over and turned into a state-owned enterprise.

By the 1980s, the factory had a debt of over CN¥1.4 million and suffered from dilapidated infrastructure, poor management, and lack of quality controls, resulting from the planned economic system and relevant policies. Production had slowed, rarely surpassing 80 refrigerators a month, and the factory was close to bankruptcy. The Qingdao government hired a young assistant city-manager, Zhang Ruimin, responsible for a number of city-owned appliance companies. Zhang was appointed the managing director of the factory in 1984.

=== Founding ===
Haier was founded as Qingdao Refrigerator Co. in 1984. With China opening up to world markets, foreign corporations began searching for partnerships in China. One of these, Germany's refrigerator company Liebherr, entered into a joint-venture contract with Qingdao Refrigerator Co., offering technology and equipment to its Chinese counterpart. Refrigerators were to be manufactured under the name of Qindao-Liebherr (simplified Chinese: 琴岛—利勃海尔; traditional Chinese: 琴島-利勃海爾; pinyin: Qíndǎo—lìbó hǎi'ěr). The current brand "Haier" came from the last two syllables of the Chinese transliteration of Liebherr (pinyin: lìbó hǎi'ěr).

The installation of Liebherr's equipment and technology was accompanied by new quality control and management processes. By 1986, Qingdao Refrigerator had returned to profitability and grew in sales at an average of 83 percent annually. Between 1984 and 2000, sales grew from CNY ¥3.5 million to ¥40.5 billion.

In 1988, the municipal government asked Haier to take over some of the city's other ailing appliance manufacturers. The company assumed control of Qingdao Electroplating Company (manufacturing microwave ovens). In 1991, the company changed its name to "Qingdao Haier Group" and acquired Qingdao Air Conditioner Plant and Qingdao Freezer. The company's name was simplified to its current name "Haier" in 1992. In 1995, the company took over Qingdao Red Star Electronics Co., a washing machine manufacturer, along with five of its subsidiaries. Haier acquired seven companies between 1995 and 1997, and began exporting to foreign markets.

=== International expansion ===
In Southeast Asia, Haier opened production facilities in Indonesia in 1996 and the Philippines in 1997 and failed in an attempt to enter the Thai market due to the presence of local competitors.

Haier entered the US market in 1999. In the US it focused upon two niche markets in compact refrigerators and electric wine cellars. Haier began to manufacture full-sized refrigerators for North American market. This would bring it into direct competition with established American companies GE, Whirlpool, Frigidaire, and Maytag. As part of its strategy, Haier built a production facility in the United States at Camden, South Carolina, opened in 2000. By 2002, US revenues reached US$200 million, still small compared to its overall revenue of $7 billion. Also in 2002, Haier moved into the Greenwich Savings Bank Building in midtown Manhattan. Formerly the headquarters for the Greenwich Savings Bank, the 52,000-square-foot (4,800 m^{2}) building was built in 1924 in the neo-classical style.

Production facilities were constructed in Pakistan in 2002 (see Haier Pakistan) and Jordan in 2003. In Africa, Haier has plants in five countries: Tunisia, Nigeria, Egypt, Algeria and South Africa. The company also purchased a Meneghetti's factory in Italy and began placing its products in European retail chains, either under its own brand or under OEM agreements with foreign partners.

Haier entered the Japanese market in 2002 and formed a product development alliance with Sanyo Electric in 2007, focusing on refrigerators. This marked Haier Group’s first international collaboration of its kind. Following the completion of the acquisition and integration of Sanyo Electric’s relevant operations in 2012, Haier launched the AQUA brand alongside the Haier brand and established Haier Asia R&D.

Haier Appliances (India) P. Ltd initiated its commercial operations in January 2004. Its headquarters is in New Delhi, and in 2015 it had 33 operations, including those in Mumbai, Bangalore, Chennai, and Kolkata. It was listed among the top 20 most trusted brands in India by The Brand Trust Report, a study conducted by Trust Research Advisory.

In June 2005, Haier bid to acquire Maytag Corporation, backed by private equity funds Blackstone Group and Bain Capital. The bid was for US$1.28 billion, or $16 per share, topping a previous offer of $14.26 per share made by Ripplewood Holdings. However, Maytag was bought by Michigan-based Whirlpool Corporation which offered $1.7 billion in cash and stock, or $21 per share, plus assumed debt.

In 2008, Haier entered into a joint venture agreement with the government of Venezuela.

In 2009, Haier surpassed Whirlpool to become the fourth largest refrigerator producer in terms of sales with a global market share of 6.3%.

In 2012, Haier Group acquired the appliance business from New Zealand-based Fisher & Paykel, and Sanyo's Southeast Asian appliance manufacturing unit.

In June 2016, Haier Group acquired GE Appliances, headquartered in Louisville, Kentucky, from General Electric for $5.6 billion.

In October 2018, Haier acquired Italy based Candy group.

By 2020, Haier had been the world's number one home appliance brand for 12 consecutive years.

In October 2024, Haier Smart Home acquired Carrier Commercial Refrigeration from Carrier Global for $775 million.

== Technology ==
In 2015, Haier began investigating how the internet of things could be integrated into its devices. The company cited by the Stanford Artificial Intelligence Laboratory, which found three barriers to the adoption of smart home technology: lack of unified protocols/single point of access, passive services and the lack of complete solutions. At the time Haier's core competencies lay within the large appliance sector and not the small electronics sector. Subsequently, it partnered with the then leading IoT platform IngDan (硬蛋) owned by Cogobuy to overcome its shortcomings. By utilising Cogobuy's ecosystem and supply chain, Haier was able to integrate IngDan's portfolio of components, modules, and edge voice analysis into smart appliance products. Haier introduced its smart appliances across seven product lines in the major appliance industry: air, water, clothes care, security, voice control, health and information.

== Company strategy ==
Zhang Ruimin, soon after becoming managing director in 1985, ordered his employees to destroy 76 refrigerators with sledgehammers following a customer complaint in an effort to radically change the company's culture to one that embodies quality control practices. At the time, Chinese brands for domestically produced consumer goods were generally regarded by overseas consumer markets as being of poor quality, even when compared subjectively with foreign brands manufactured in China. The cultural transformation towards quality driven manufacturing resulted in Haier becoming the first company in China to get ISO 9001 certification.

Haier also has an environmental sustainable development strategy to improve the environment by conserving energy and recycling. In 2018, Haier got the "Greener China Business Award" due to its outstanding efforts to protect the environment. In 2015, Haier joined WIPO GREEN as an official partner in an effort to address climate change. Haier also announced a three-year partnership with the Australian Open in November 2024.

== Brand Ambassadors ==
Period	Market	Ambassador / Endorser	Role / Notes
2010	India	John Abraham	Face of Haier India's "You Inspire Us" campaign.
2017–2023	Thailand	Pakorn Chatborirak	Haier Thailand brand ambassador for multiple consecutive years.
2021–2022	Philippines	Ivana Alawi	Brand ambassador for Haier Philippines.
2023–2024	Malaysia	Aaron Chia and Soh Wooi Yik	Brand ambassadors for Haier Malaysia.
2024–present	Global	Ana Ivanovic	Global brand ambassador for Haier.
2024–present	Japan	Yuzuru Hanyu	Brand ambassador for both Haier & AQUA Japan.
2024–2025	Pakistan	Arshad Nadeem	Brand ambassador for Haier Pakistan.
2024–present	Philippines	Pia Wurtzbach	Brand ambassador / endorser for Haier Philippines.
2025–present	Thailand	BamBam (singer)	Brand ambassador for Haier Thailand.

== Controversy ==
In 2014, Haier was accused by German media of delivering smartphones and tablets with pre-installed malware.

In 2024, Haier sent cease and desist letters to the open-source projects hOn and pyhOn, which developed an add-on for Home Assistant that allowed one to control appliances without Haier's 3rd-party cloud service.

Following Russia's invasion of Ukraine in 2022 and subsequent international sanctions, Haier faced criticism for its continued expansion in the Russian market. Haier announced plans to increase production in Naberezhnye Chelny, including facilities for refrigerators, washing machines, and televisions, along with the establishment of a fourth factory and plans to recruit developers in Russia for its proprietary OS for smart appliances. The company also plans to repurpose Candy's factory in Kirov to further expand its manufacturing capabilities in Russia. Despite global calls for corporate responsibility, Haier has significantly increased its revenue in Russia, reportedly more than 1.5 times in 2023 compared to 2022.

== See also ==
- TCL Corporation
- GE Appliances
- Siemens AG
- AB Electrolux
- Airmate Electrical
- Maytag Corporation
- Samsung Electronics
- Sanyo
