= Amenable =

Amenable may refer to:

- Amenable group
- Amenable species
- Amenable number
- Amenable set

== See also ==
- Agreeableness
