= Armstrong Lee & Baker =

American law firm based in Houston, Texas

Armstrong Lee & Baker LLP
- Headquarters: Houston, Texas, United States
- Offices: Houston and Dallas, Texas
- Date founded: 2017
- Founder: Scott Armstrong and Joshua Lee
- Company type: Limited liability partnership
- Website: albtriallawyers.com

Armstrong Lee & Baker LLP is an American plaintiffs' law firm based in Houston, Texas, with a second office located in Dallas. Established in 2017 by lawyers Scott Armstrong and Joshua Lee, Armstrong Lee & Baker LLP handles personal injury, workplace injury, wrongful death, and other civil litigation cases. Lawyers from the firm have appeared before the Supreme Court of Texas and the United States Court of Appeals for the Fifth Circuit.

== History ==
Armstrong Lee & Baker LLP opened its doors in Houston in 2017 through the efforts of Scott Armstrong and Joshua Lee. According to the published history of the law firm, the firm commenced operations in August of that year. Armstrong and Lee both graduated from the University of Houston Law Center before going on to pursue separate legal careers; Armstrong then became a personal-injury litigator in Houston while Lee focused his career on commercial litigation and investigations in New York and Houston. Prior to establishing Armstrong Lee & Baker LLP, Armstrong had worked at Houston personal injury firms such as Arnold & Itkin and Abraham, Watkins, Nichols, Sorrels, Agosto & Friend, and Lee had worked at Sullivan & Cromwell in New York and at Beck Redden in Houston. According to the history of the firm, the practice grew to include 20-attorneys and 70 staff members. The firm operates offices in Houston and Dallas, Texas. In August 2026, The Real Deal noted that there were plans to carry out a renovation valued at around $10.6 million in connection with office space leased by the firm, which was scheduled for completion in March 2027. The construction was related to building ownership interests associated with the project, not to the law firm; hence the cost of construction should not be seen as an expenditure by the law firm. In October 2026, Intelligence360 reported on public records relating to the 36,000-square-foot project at 2800 North Loop West, which was estimated to be worth $10.57 million and planned to be occupied in March 2027. The development-data publication drew its information from development records and the website of the law firm.

== Attorneys ==
Scott Armstrong is a co-founder and managing partner of Armstrong Lee & Baker. He graduated from the University of Houston Law Center in 2014 and previously practiced at other Houston plaintiffs' law firms. In 2024, Armstrong received the Rising Star Award from the University of Houston Law Alumni Association. In September 2026, the University of Houston announced that Armstrong and his wife Jessica Armstrong, both graduates of the University of Houston Law Center, committed $1.2 million for the creation of the Professor Joseph Sanders Endowed Professorship in Torts. Joshua Lee is a co-founder and partner of the firm. He graduated from New York University School of Law and previously practiced at Sullivan & Cromwell in New York and Beck Redden in Houston.

In an interview with Houston television station KPRC-TV in May 2025, Lee was asked to speak about delays in Harris County civil litigation resulting from a lack of district courts. In this interview, Lee mentioned a case in which he represented a construction worker, and was quoted on how such court delays affect litigants.

C.J. Baker is a partner at the firm. He earned his law degree from the Texas Tech University School of Law in 2016. Baker previously worked as a personal injury lawyer, handling cases that included defective medical devices and catastrophic injuries.

== Litigation ==
=== Appellate litigation ===
Scott Armstrong and Joshua Lee were among the attorneys representing plaintiffs in litigation arising from a May 2018 chemical release and fire at a Kuraray America plant in Pasadena, Texas.

The litigation included proceedings before the Supreme Court of Texas. In In re Kuraray America, Inc. (2022), the court considered the permissible scope of discovery of employees' cellphone data and conditionally granted Kuraray's petition for mandamus relief. The court held that a party seeking such data must provide evidence that cell-phone use could have contributed to the underlying incident, with any production limited to a relevant time period. Bloomberg Law separately reported on the decision and the court's limitations on cell-phone-data discovery.

Scott Armstrong, Joshua Lee and Christopher Baker represented Reannah Vela in a lawsuit filed as a result of a chemical flash fire at the Valero Refinery in Corpus Christi, Texas in February 2018. Vela's suit alleged that she was burned by defective containers containing chemical waste. The case of Valero Refinery-Texas LP v. Vela (2022) contained a procedural question on an interlocutory appeal that was ultimately denied by the Supreme Court of Texas without making a ruling regarding the liability for the injuries.

Armstrong Lee & Baker represented Marvin Jackson in his case against World Wrestling Entertainment for the alleged hearing loss he sustained during a fireworks display for WWE. The Fifth Circuit upheld an order of the trial court that had directed Jackson to submit his claims to arbitration in Jackson v. World Wrestling Entertainment, Inc. (2024). According to a Law360 article published in April 2025, the case against WWE was dismissed after Jackson reached a settlement agreement.

Armstrong Lee & Baker represented the plaintiffs in Williams v. Wingrove (2025). The plaintiffs' claims were based on the death of a worker allegedly due to COVID-19, who worked at a Tyson Foods facility in Carthage, Texas. When the federal district court dismissed the plaintiffs' claims, the Fifth Circuit affirmed in part and reversed in part. The Fifth Circuit determined that the plaintiffs' state-law negligence claims against Tyson were not preempted by the Poultry Products Inspection Act. Therefore, it reversed the dismissal of those claims and remanded the case to the district court for further proceedings. The published Fifth Circuit opinion identifies Joshua D. Lee as the counsel for the plaintiffs' appeal, and Scott Parker Armstrong as additional counsel for the plaintiffs. Both of these attorneys were identified as affiliated with Armstrong Lee and Baker LLP. Law360 reported on the appellate decision in August 2025.

Joshua Lee and Scott Armstrong represented the plaintiffs in City of Houston v. Manning (2025), a case in which the plaintiffs sued the Houston Fire Department for accident claims involving a Houston Fire Department vehicle. The decision before the Texas Supreme Court was whether a waiver of governmental immunity under the Texas Tort Claims Act applies to negligence per se.

The Texas Twelfth Court of Appeals rendered a judgment in March 2026 in favor of Jerry Thomas in connection with a lawsuit concerning an injury at a sawmill owned by Antonio Munoz Aserradero, LLC. The appeal addressed several issues, including whether Thomas was an employee or volunteer for purposes of the Texas Workers' Compensation Act's exclusive-remedy provision, evidentiary rulings, and individual liability. The appellate court affirmed the trial court's judgment. According to the Business Insurance news article, the appellate judgment upheld the verdict awarding Mr. Thomas $4.5 million. According to Armstrong Lee & Baker, Joshua Lee was lead appellate counsel for Thomas based on the information provided in the attorney biography.

The Texas Tenth Court of Appeals determined in July 2026 that Sysco USA I Inc. could not compel arbitration of the delivery driver’s injury claim in accordance with the Federal Arbitration Act due to the transportation worker exemption applicable to the delivery driver. This case was mentioned in the Law360 news article.

=== Other litigation ===
In October 2025, Armstrong Lee & Baker joined Hughes & Coleman and Terry Bryant, PLLC in investigating an explosion at Accurate Energetic Systems in Tennessee that killed 16 people. Nashville television station WTVF reported on a wrongful-death lawsuit arising from the explosion. WSMV separately reported that Armstrong Lee & Baker was partnering with the other law firms to investigate the explosion and described the allegations in the lawsuit.

In March 2026, the firm represented Jamie Huntzinger in a lawsuit against the Houston Astros and fireworks company ProFX. The lawsuit alleged that a postgame firework injured Huntzinger's eye in July 2025. The litigation was reported by Chron and Law360.

== Recognition ==
Scott Armstrong and Joshua Lee appeared in Houstonia magazine's 2021–2022 Top Lawyers directory in the personal injury category, under the firm's earlier name, Armstrong & Lee LLP. In 2026, Armstrong, Lee and C.J. Baker were included in the Lawdragon 500 Leading Plaintiff Consumer Lawyers guide. In the 2026 Texas Super Lawyers selections, Joshua Lee was selected to the Super Lawyers list, while Scott Armstrong and C.J. Baker were selected to the Rising Stars list. In the 2027 edition of The Best Lawyers in America, Armstrong, Lee and Baker were listed in admiralty and maritime law, with Baker also receiving recognition in plaintiffs' personal injury litigation cases.

According to TopVerdict, in the 2025 Texas settlement rankings, a $42.5 million settlement was listed in the case of Deceased Worker v. Petrochemical Co., which credited attorneys C.J. Baker, Scott P. Armstrong, Emma Coomes and Joshua Lee of Armstrong Lee & Baker won. This result was ranked first in six categories, including workplace negligence, workplace safety, and industrial accidents. The same result was also listed in the top 10 premises liability settlements in Texas for 2025.
