= FSIA =

FSIA may refer to:

- Food Safety Institute of the Americas
- Foreign Sovereign Immunities Act
- Seychelles International Airport, its ICAO airport code
