= Meat-packing industry =

Industrial production of food and by-products from animals

External videos
- Meatpacking: Last Week Tonight with John Oliver (HBO) on YouTube

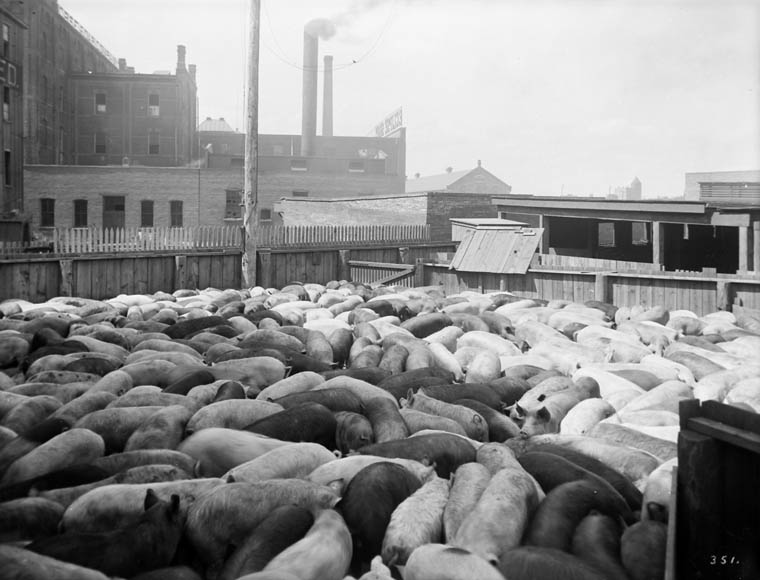
The William Davies Company facilities in Toronto, Ontario, Canada, circa 1920. This facility was then the third largest hog-packing plant in North America.

The meat-packing industry (also spelled meatpacking industry or meat packing industry) handles the slaughtering, processing, packaging, and distribution of meat from animals such as cattle, pigs, sheep and other livestock. Poultry is generally not included. This greater part of the entire meat industry is primarily focused on producing meat for human consumption, but it also yields a variety of by-products including hides, dried blood, protein meals such as meat & bone meal, and—through the process of rendering—fats (such as tallow).

In the United States and some other countries, the facility where the meat packing is done is called a slaughterhouse, packinghouse or a meat-packing plant; in New Zealand, where most of the products are exported, it is called a freezing works. An abattoir is a place where animals are slaughtered for food.

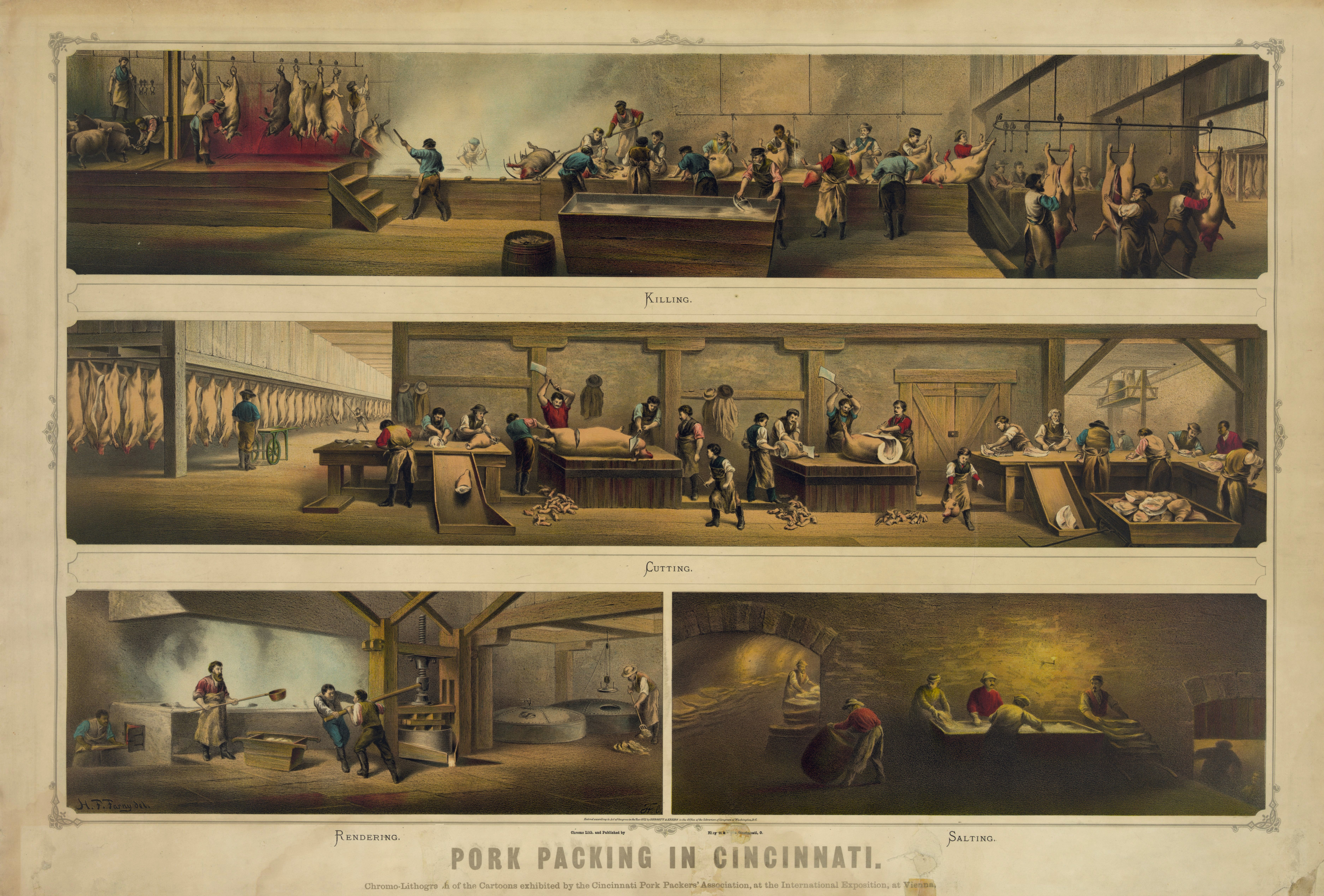
Pork packing in Cincinnati, 1873

The meat-packing industry grew with the construction of railroads and methods of refrigeration for meat preservation. Railroads made possible the transport of stock to central points for processing, and the transport of products.

== History ==
=== United States ===
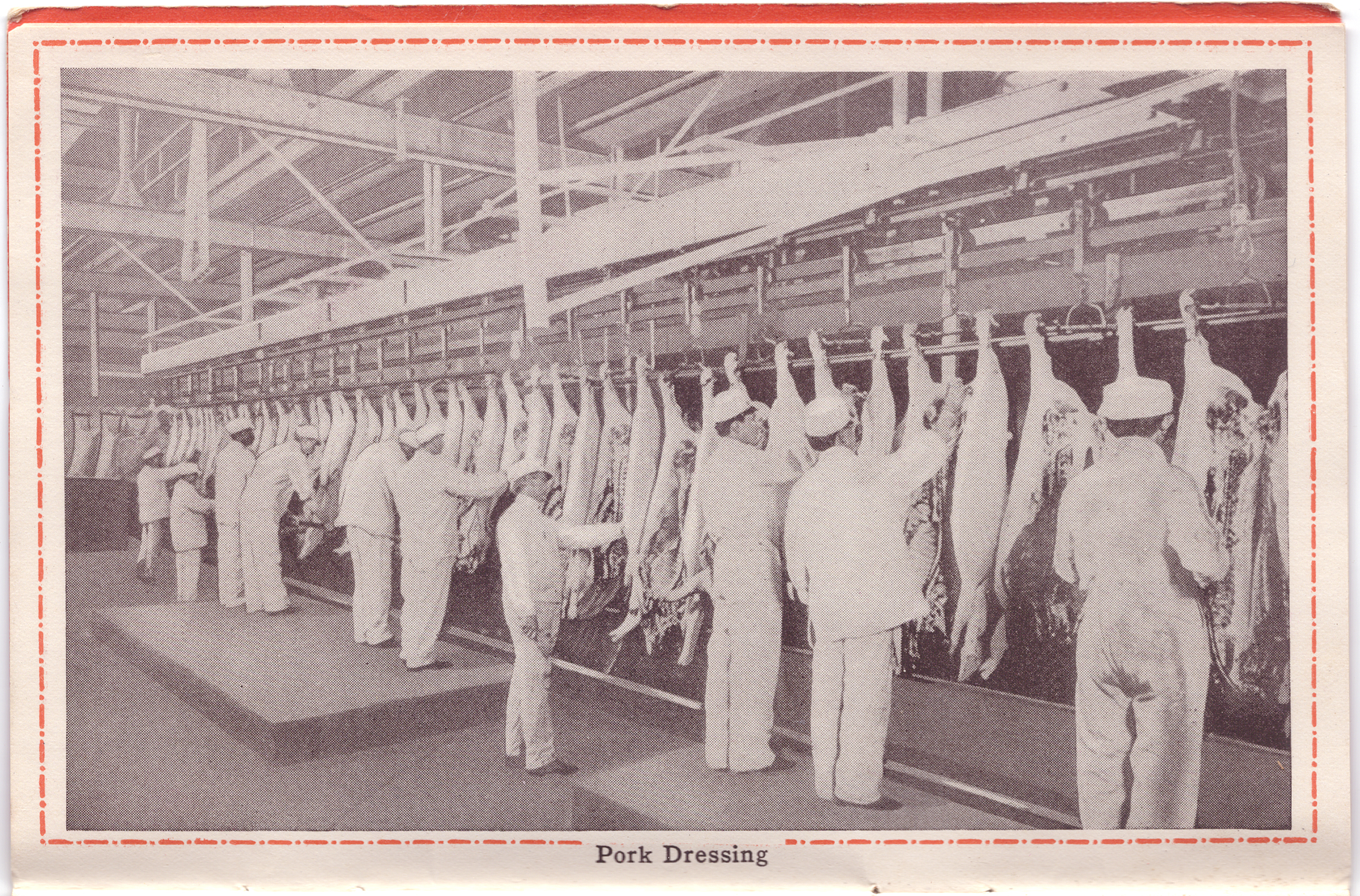
Postcard of pork dressing in Texas, undated

Before the American Civil War, the meat industry was localized, with farmers providing cattle and hogs for nearby butchers to serve the local market. Large Army contracts during the Civil War attracted entrepreneurs with a vision for building much larger markets. The 1865–1873 era provided five factors that expanded the industry to a national scale:

- The rapid growth of cities provided a lucrative new market for fresh meat.
- The emergence of large-scale ranching, the role of the railroads, refrigeration, and entrepreneurial skills.
- Cattle ranching on a large-scale moved to the Great Plains, from Texas northward.
- Overland cattle drives moved large herds to the railheads in Kansas, where cattle cars brought live animals eastward.
- Abilene, Kansas, became the chief railhead, shipping 35,000 cattle per year, mostly to Kansas City, Milwaukee and Chicago.

In Milwaukee, Philip Armour, an ambitious entrepreneur from New York who made his fortune in Army contracts during the war, partnered with Jacob Plankinton to build a highly efficient stockyard that serviced the upper Midwest. Chicago built the famous Union Stock Yards in 1865 on 345 acres to the south of downtown. Armour opened the Chicago plant, as did Nelson Morris, another wartime contractor. Cincinnati and Buffalo, both with good water and rail service, also opened stockyards. Perhaps the most energetic entrepreneur was Gustavus Franklin Swift, who moved to Chicago in 1875, specializing in long distance refrigerated meat shipments to eastern cities.

A practical refrigerated (ice-cooled) rail car was introduced in 1881. This made it possible to ship cattle and hog carcasses, which weighed only 40% as much as live animals; the entire national market, served by the railroads, was opened up, as well as transatlantic markets using refrigerated ships. Swift developed an integrated network of cattle procurement, slaughtering, meat-packing, and shipping meat to market. Up to that time, cattle were driven great distances to railroad shipping points, causing the cattle to lose considerable weight. Swift developed a large business, which grew in size with the entry of several competitors. The Bureau of Corporations, predecessor of the Federal Trade Commission investigated the country's meatpackers for anti-competitive practices in the 1900s.

The Pure Food and Drug Act of 1906 was the first of a series of legislation that led to the establishment of the Food and Drug Administration (FDA). Another such act passed the same year was the Federal Meat Inspection Act. The new laws helped the large packers, and hurt small operations that lacked economy of scale or quality controls.

Historian William Cronon concludes:

Because of the Chicago packers, ranchers in Wyoming and feedlot farmers in Iowa regularly found a reliable market for their animals, and on average received better prices for the animals they sold there. At the same time and for the same reason, Americans of all classes found a greater variety of more and better meats on their tables, purchased on average at lower prices than ever before. Seen in this light, the Packers' "rigid system of economy" seemed a very good thing indeed.

==== Changing geography ====
The industry after 1945 closed its stockyards in big cities like Chicago and moved operations to small towns close to cattle ranches, especially in Iowa, Nebraska and Colorado. Historically, besides Cincinnati, Chicago and Omaha, the other major meat-packing cities had been South St. Paul, Minnesota; East St. Louis, Illinois; Dubuque, Iowa; Kansas City, Missouri; Austin, Minnesota; Sioux Falls, South Dakota; and Sioux City, Iowa.

==== Rail to truck ====
Mid-century restructuring by the industry of the stockyards, slaughterhouses and meat-packing plants led to relocating facilities closer to cattle feedlots and swine production facilities, to more rural areas, as transportation shifted from rail to truck. It has been difficult for labor to organize in such locations. In addition, the number of jobs fell sharply due to technology and other changes. Wages fell during the latter part of the 20th century, and eventually, both Chicago (in 1971) and Omaha (in 1999) closed their stockyards. The workforce increasingly relied on recent migrants from Mexico.

=== Argentina ===
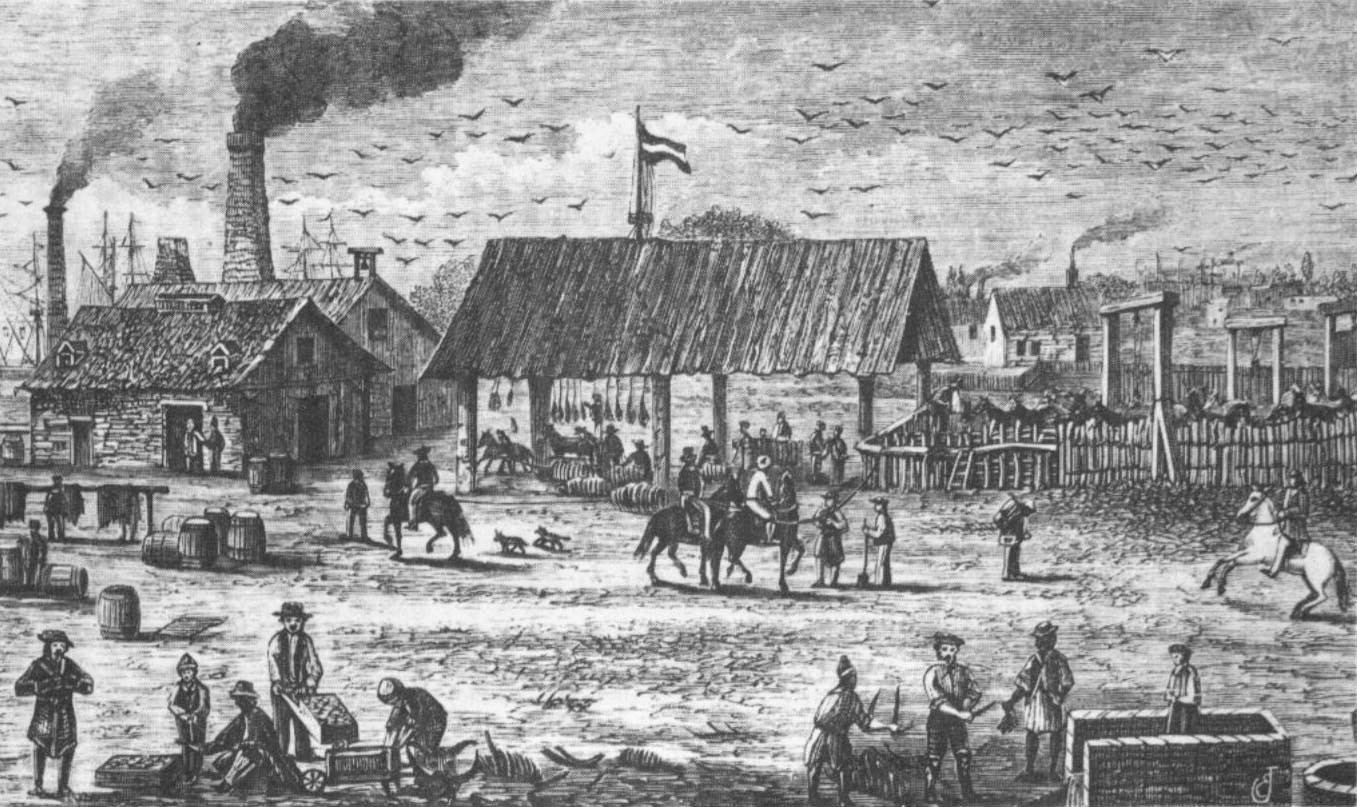
A saladero in Rosario, Argentina, 1860s

Argentina had the natural resources and human talent to build a world-class meat-packing industry. However, its success in reaching European markets was limited by the poor quality control in the production of its meat and the general inferiority of frozen meat to the chilled meat exported by the United States and Australia. By 1900, the Argentine government encouraged investment in the industry to improve quality. The British dominated the world shipping industry and began fitting their ships for cold air containers, and built new refrigerated steamers. When the Argentine industry finally secured a large slice of the British market, foot-and-mouth disease and trade restrictions limited its penetration of the Continent.

=== China ===
Meat in China moved from a minor specialty commodity to a major factor in the food supply in the late 20th century thanks to the rapid emergence of a middle class with upscale tastes and plenty of money. It was a transition from a country able to provide a small ration of meat for urban citizens only to the world's largest meat producer; it was a movement from a handful of processing facilities in major cities to thousands of modern meat-packing and processing plants throughout the country, alongside the rapid growth of a middle-class with spending money.

== Labor and safety issues ==
In the early 20th century, meatpacking companies employed new immigrants as strikebreakers during labor actions initiated by workers, who were often earlier immigrants themselves or the immediate descendants of immigrants. The publication of the Upton Sinclair novel The Jungle in the U.S. in 1906 shocked the public with the poor working conditions and unsanitary practices in the meat-packing plants in the United States, specifically Chicago.

Meat-packing plants, like many industries in the early 20th century, overworked their employees, failed to maintain adequate safety measures, and actively fought unionization. Meat-packing workers were exposed to dangerous chemicals and sharp machinery, and routinely suffered horrific injuries. Public pressure of the U.S. Congress led to the passage of the Meat Inspection Act and Pure Food and Drug Act (both passed in 1906 on the same day) to ensure better regulations of the meat-packing industry.

In the 1920s and early 1930s, workers achieved unionization under the CIO's United Packinghouse Workers of America (UPWA). An interracial committee led the organizing in Chicago, where the majority of workers in the industry were black, and other major cities, such as Omaha, Nebraska, where they were an important minority in the industry. UPWA workers made important gains in wages, hours and benefits. In 1957, the stockyards and meat-packing plants employed half the workers of Omaha. The union supported a progressive agenda, including the Civil Rights Movement of the 1960s. While the work was still difficult, for a few decades workers achieved blue-collar, middle-class lives from it.

Though the meat-packing industry has made many improvements since the early 20th century, extensive changes in the industry since the late 20th century have caused new labor issues to arise. Today, the rate of injury in the meat-packing industry is three times that of the private industry overall, and meat-packing was noted by Human Rights Watch as being "the most dangerous factory job in America". The meatpacking industry continues to employ many immigrant laborers, including some who are undocumented workers. In the early 20th century the workers were immigrants from eastern and southern Europe and black migrants from the South. Today, many meatpacking workers are Hispanics hailing from Mexico, Central and South America. A notable amount of workers are from Peru, leading to the formation of a large Peruvian community in the industry. The isolated areas in which many plants are located put these workers at greater risk due to their limited ability to organize and seek redress for work-related injuries.

American slaughterhouse workers are three times more likely to suffer serious injury than the average American worker. NPR reports that pig and cattle slaughterhouse workers are nearly seven times more likely to suffer repetitive strain injuries than average. The Guardian reported in 2018 that on average there were two amputations a week involving slaughterhouse workers in the United States. On average, one employee of Tyson Foods, the largest meat producer in America, is injured and amputates a finger or limb per month. The Bureau of Investigative Journalism reported that over a period of six years in the UK, 78 slaughter workers lost fingers, parts of fingers or limbs, more than 800 workers had serious injuries, and at least 4,500 had to take more than three days off after accidents.

In a 2018 study in the Italian Journal of Food Safety, slaughterhouse workers are instructed to wear ear protectors to protect their hearing from the constant screams of animals being killed. A 2004 study in the Journal of Occupational and Environmental Medicine found that "excess risks were observed for mortality from all causes, all cancers, and lung cancer" in workers employed in the New Zealand meat processing industry.

The worst thing, worse than the physical danger, is the emotional toll. If you work in the stick pit [where hogs are killed] for any period of time—that lets you kill things but doesn't let you care. You may look a hog in the eye that's walking around in the blood pit with you and think, 'God, that really isn't a bad-looking animal.' You may want to pet it. Pigs down on the kill floor have come up to nuzzle me like a puppy. Two minutes later I had to kill them—beat them to death with a pipe. I can't care.

— Gail A. Eisnitz,

The act of slaughtering animals or of raising or transporting animals for slaughter may engender psychological stress or trauma in the people involved. A 2016 study in Organization indicates, "Regression analyses of data from 10,605 Danish workers across 44 occupations suggest that slaughterhouse workers consistently experience lower physical and psychological well-being along with increased incidences of negative coping behavior". A 2009 study by criminologist Amy Fitzgerald indicates, "slaughterhouse employment increases total arrest rates, arrests for violent crimes, arrests for rape, and arrests for other sex offenses in comparison with other industries". As authors from the PTSD Journal stated, "These employees are hired to kill animals, such as pigs and cows that are largely gentle creatures. Carrying out this action requires workers to disconnect from what they are doing and from the creature standing before them. This emotional dissonance can lead to consequences such as domestic violence, social withdrawal, anxiety, drug and alcohol abuse, and PTSD".

Slaughterhouses in the United States commonly unlawfully employ and exploit underage workers and illegal immigrants. In 2010, Human Rights Watch described slaughterhouse line work in the United States as a human rights crime. In a report by Oxfam America, slaughterhouse workers were observed not being allowed breaks, were often required to wear diapers, and were paid below minimum wage.

Another problem in this context is that the pharmaceutical industry obtains basic materials for its products from the meat-packing industry; for example, tissue extracts from slaughterhouse waste. In the COVID-19 pandemic in 2020, this led to the paradoxical situation that mass slaughterhouses were infection drivers due to the bad labor conditions and at the same time suppliers of important therapeutics such as heparin, which subsequently became a scarce commodity. Medical historian Benjamin Prinz has therefore pointed to the fragility of today's healthcare systems, which themselves participate in environmentally destructive and disease-causing production chains.

Contemporary concerns about the meat industry within the American context have often been colored by the COVID-19 pandemic and the resulting supply chain issues. Beyond the consumer perspective, workers were expected to drastically increase the rate at which they process animals. For instance, workers were expected to process 175 birds per minute up from 140 birds per minute. In part this was due to shortages of workers. Workers within the industry were often in the news for large outbreaks within factories. By its nature meat processing requires close proximity to other workers and exposure to a slew of bacteria and viruses. Additionally, workers often have to yell over loud machinery which increases the amount of contaminated droplets in the air. More than 50,000 meat packing workers contracted the disease and over 200 died. Disease is not evenly distributed throughout factories and all workers in a given factory are not at equal risk for exposure and negative health outcomes despite working the same job. In particular, the overlap of immigration status and workplace exposures can result in a variety of negative health outcomes.

== Meat-packing companies ==
By 1900, the dominant meat-packers were:

- Armour
  - Morris (acquired in 1923)
- Cudahy
- Wilson
- Swift

In the 1990s, the dominant meat-packers were:

- Iowa Beef Processors
- ConAgra Foods
- Excel Corporation

Current significant meat-packers in the US include:

Beef Packers

- Tyson Foods
- Cargill Meat Solutions (Excel)
- JBS USA (Swift)
- National Beef

Pork

- Smithfield Foods
- Seaboard Corporation
- Tyson Foods
- JBS USA
- Cargill Meat Solutions

Broiler Chickens

- JBS USA (Pilgrim's Pride)
- Tyson Foods
- Perdue Farms
- Sanderson Farms

=== Outside the US ===
- Teys Australia
- JBS S.A. (Brazil)
- Marfrig S.A. (Brazil)
- BRF S.A. (Brazil)
- Charoen Pokphand Group (Thailand)
- Imperial Cold Storage and Supply Company (South Africa)
- Maple Leaf Foods (Canada)
- Schneider Foods (Canada)
- Cargill Proteins (Canada)
- AFFCO Holdings (New Zealand)
- Frigorífico Rioplatense (Argentina)
- Coto (Argentina)
- Frigorífico Gorina (Argentina)

== See also ==
- Animal–industrial complex
- Continuous inspection
- Environmental impact of meat production
- Golden Triangle of Meat-packing
- Labor rights in American meatpacking industry
- Slaughterhouse
- Union Stock Yards, Chicago
- Green Bay Packers, Named after industry
