= Test and hold =

In the United States meat industry, test and hold requirements mandate that federal meat inspectors hold on applying the "inspected and passed" mark on the carcasses of cattle that have been sampled by the Animal and Plant Health Inspection Service (APHIS) for its BSE surveillance program until the sample is determined to be negative (69 FR 1892, January 12, 2004).

Prior to this, unless prohibited by a Food Safety and Inspection Service (FSIS) veterinary medical officer, carcasses of BSE sampled animals were allowed to be stamped “inspected and passed” prior to the sample results being received and packing plants were allowed to process them for human consumption.
