= Performance-based inspection system =

The Performance-Based Inspection System (PBIS) is a computer-based system used by USDA’s meat and poultry inspection agency, the Food Safety and Inspection Service (FSIS). The system organizes inspection requirements, schedules inspection activities, and maintains records of findings for meat and poultry processing operations under federal inspection.

== Controversy ==
PBIS has been at issue because consumer advocates and some inspectors have contended that it is not flexible and second-guesses inspectors’ more reliable experience and judgment. USDA views it as an objective tool for inspection that enhances rather than undermines inspectors’ roles.
