= Slaughterhouse =

Facility where animals are slaughtered for meat

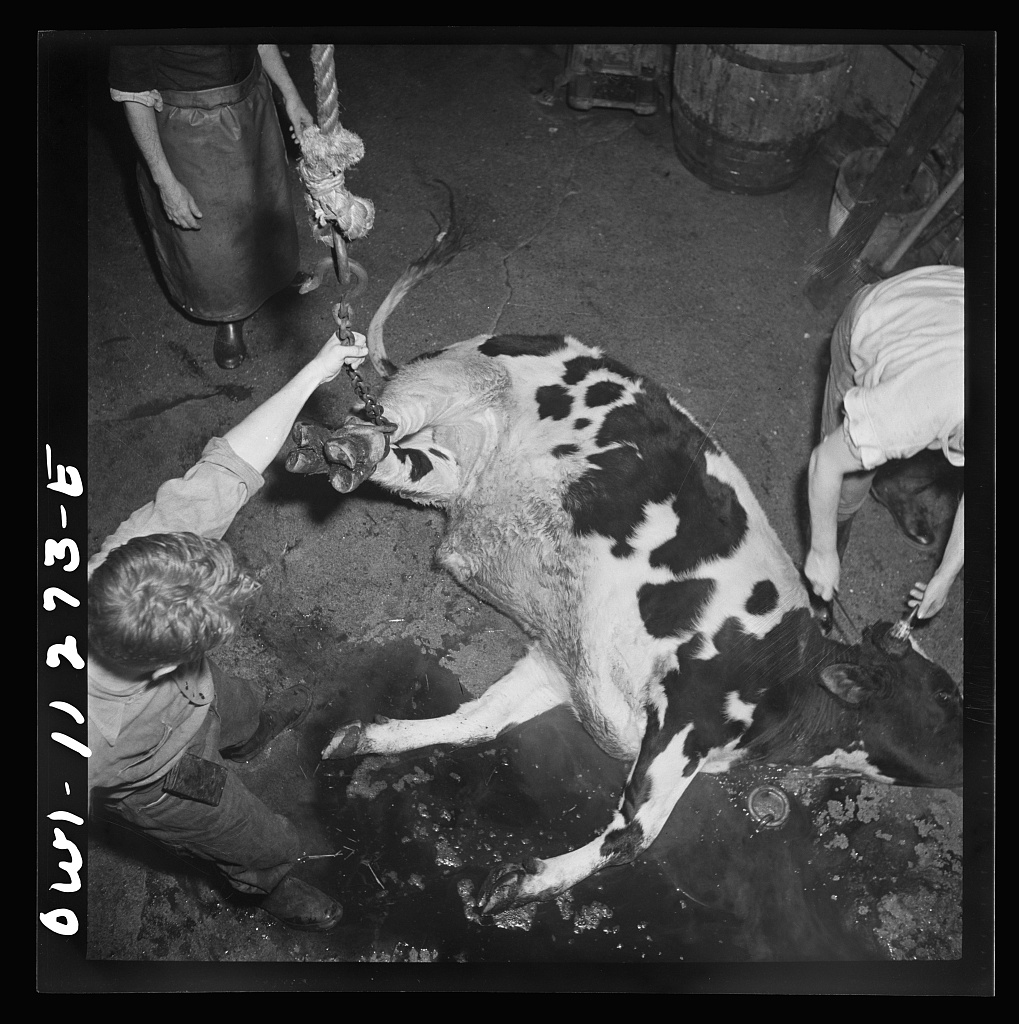
Workers and cattle in a slaughterhouse in 1942

In livestock agriculture and the meat industry, a slaughterhouse, also called an abattoir (/ˈæbətwɑːr/), is a facility where livestock animals are slaughtered to provide food. Slaughterhouses supply meat, which then becomes the responsibility of a meat-packing facility.

Slaughterhouses that produce meat that is not intended for human consumption are sometimes referred to as knacker's yards or knackeries. This is where animals are slaughtered that are not fit for human consumption or that can no longer work on a farm, such as retired work horses.

Slaughtering animals on a large scale poses significant issues in terms of logistics, animal welfare, and the environment, and the process must meet public health requirements. Due to public aversion in different cultures, determining where to build slaughterhouses is also a matter of some consideration.

Frequently, animal rights groups raise concerns about the methods of transport to and from slaughterhouses, preparation prior to slaughter, animal herding, stunning methods, and the killing itself.

== History ==
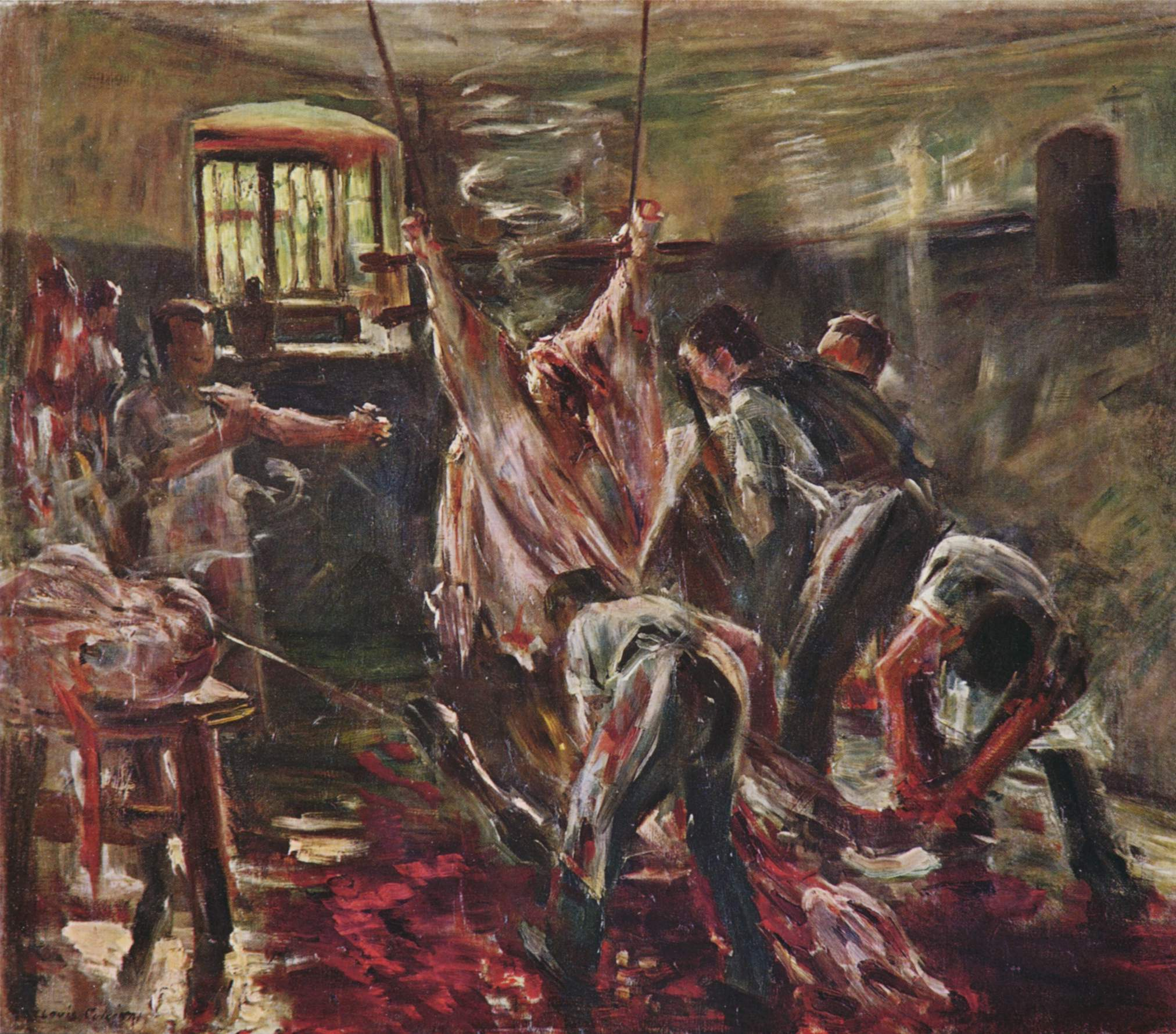
In the slaughterhouse, Lovis Corinth, 1893

Until modern times, animals were slaughtered in a haphazard and unregulated manner in diverse places. Early maps of London show numerous stockyards in the periphery of the city, where slaughter occurred in the open air or under cover such as wet markets. Such open-air slaughterhouses were called shambles, and there are streets named "The Shambles" in some English and Irish towns (e.g., Worcester, York, Bandon) where butchers killed and prepared animals for consumption. Fishamble Street, Dublin, was formerly a fish-shambles. Sheffield had 183 slaughterhouses in 1910, and it was estimated that there were 20,000 in England and Wales.

=== Reform movement ===
The slaughterhouse emerged as a coherent institution in the 19th century. A combination of health and social concerns, exacerbated by the rapid urbanisation experienced during the Industrial Revolution, led social reformers to call for the isolation, sequester and regulation of animal slaughter. As well as the concerns raised regarding hygiene and disease, there were also criticisms of the practice on the grounds that the effect that killing had, both on the butchers and the observers, "educate[d] the men in the practice of violence and cruelty, so that they seem to have no restraint on the use of it." An additional motivation for eliminating private slaughter was to impose a careful system of regulation for the "morally dangerous" task of putting animals to death.

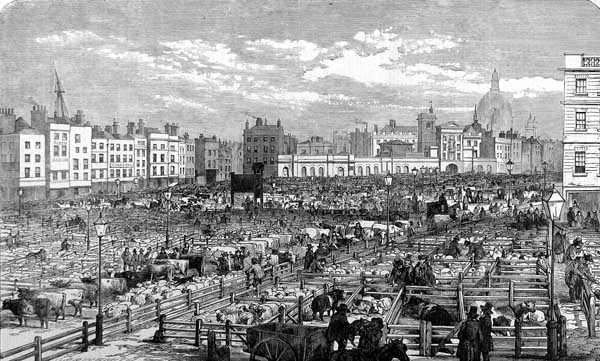
London's Smithfield Market in 1855, before it was reconstructed

As a result of this tension, meat markets within the city were closed and abattoirs built outside city limits. An early framework for the establishment of public slaughterhouses was put in place in Paris in 1810, under the reign of the Emperor Napoleon. Five areas were set aside on the outskirts of the city and the feudal privileges of the guilds were curtailed.

As the meat requirements of the growing number of residents in London steadily expanded, the meat markets both within the city and beyond attracted increasing levels of public disapproval. Meat had been traded at Smithfield Market as early as the 10th century. By 1726, it was regarded as "without question, the greatest in the world", by Daniel Defoe. By the middle of the 19th century, in the course of a single year 220,000 head of cattle and 1,500,000 sheep would be "violently forced into an area of five acres, in the very heart of London, through its narrowest and most crowded thoroughfares".

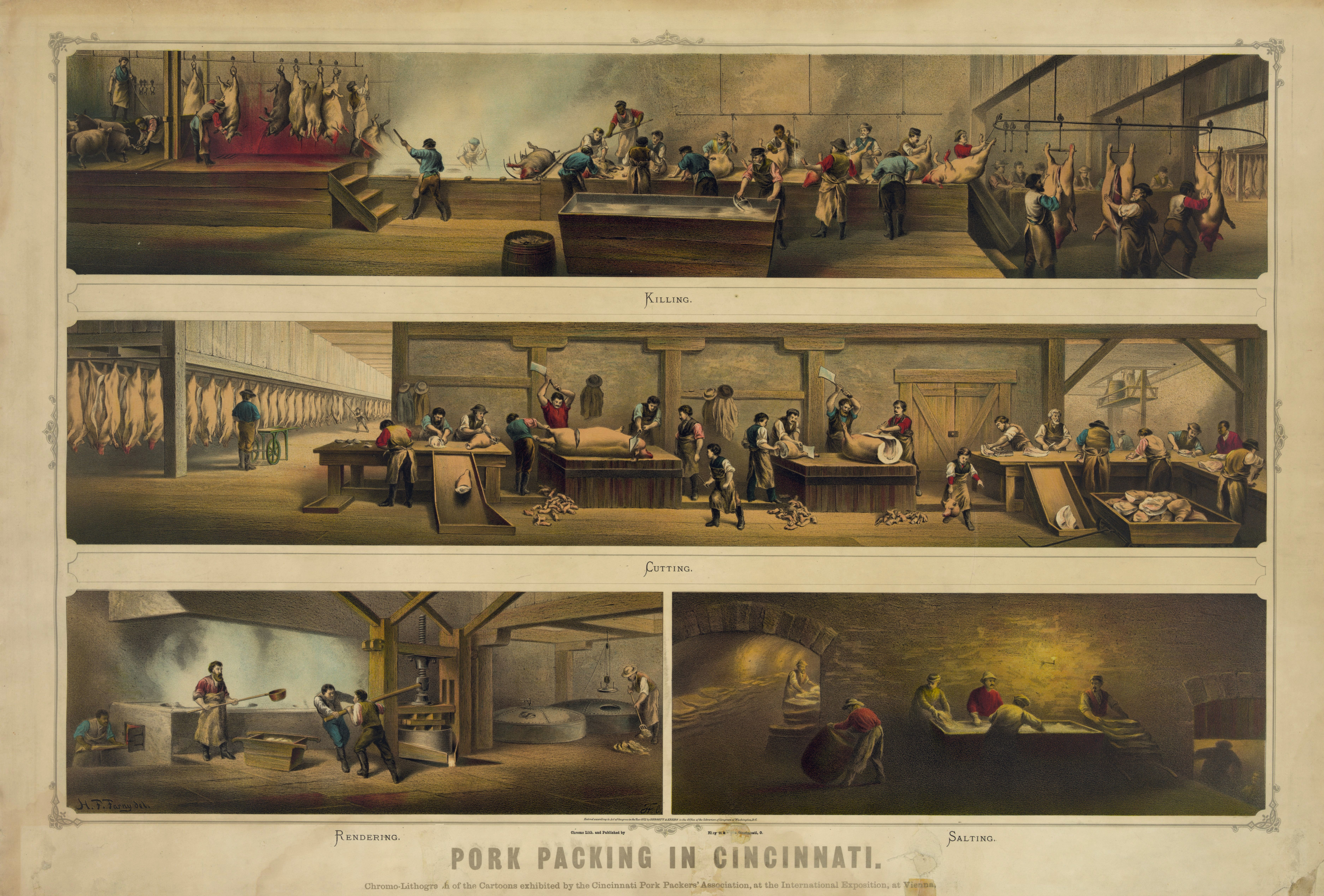
Pork packing in Cincinnati. Print from 1873 showing four scenes in a packing house: "Killing, Cutting, Rendering, [and] Salting."

By the early 19th century, pamphlets were being circulated arguing in favor of the removal of the livestock market and its relocation outside of the city due to the extremely low hygienic conditions as well as the brutal treatment of the cattle. In 1843, the Farmer's Magazine published a petition signed by bankers, salesmen, aldermen, butchers and local residents against the expansion of the livestock market. The Town Police Clauses Act 1847 created a licensing and registration system, though few slaughter houses were closed.

An Act of Parliament was eventually passed in 1852. Under its provisions, a new cattle-market was constructed in Copenhagen Fields, Islington. The new Metropolitan Cattle Market was also opened in 1855, and West Smithfield was left as waste ground for about a decade, until the construction of the new market began in the 1860s under the authority of the 1860 Metropolitan Meat and Poultry Market Act. The market was designed by architect Sir Horace Jones and was completed in 1868.

A cut and cover railway tunnel was constructed beneath the market to create a triangular junction with the railway between Blackfriars and King's Cross. This allowed animals to be transported into the slaughterhouse by train and the subsequent transfer of animal carcasses to the Cold Store building, or direct to the meat market via lifts.

At the same time, the first large and centralized slaughterhouse in Paris was constructed in 1867 under the orders of Napoleon III at the Parc de la Villette and heavily influenced the subsequent development of the institution throughout Europe.

=== Regulation and expansion ===
Blueprint for a mechanized public abattoir, designed by slaughterhouse reformer Benjamin Ward Richardson

These slaughterhouses were regulated by law to ensure good standards of hygiene, the prevention of the spread of disease and the minimization of needless animal cruelty. The slaughterhouse had to be equipped with a specialized water supply system to effectively clean the operating area of blood and offal. Veterinary scientists, notably George Fleming and John Gamgee, campaigned for stringent levels of inspection to ensure that epizootics such as rinderpest (a devastating outbreak of the disease covered all of Britain in 1865) would not be able to spread. By 1874, three meat inspectors were appointed for the London area, and the Public Health Act 1875 required local authorities to provide central slaughterhouses (they were only given powers to close unsanitary slaughterhouses in 1890). Yet the appointment of slaughterhouse inspectors and the establishment of centralised abattoirs took place much earlier in the British colonies, such as the colonies of New South Wales and Victoria, and in Scotland where 80% of cattle were slaughtered in public abattoirs by 1930. In Victoria the Melbourne Abattoirs Act 1850 (NSW) "confined the slaughtering of animals to prescribed public abattoirs, while at the same time prohibiting the killing of sheep, lamb, pigs or goats at any other place within the city limits". Animals were shipped alive to British ports from Ireland, from Europe and from the colonies and slaughtered in large abattoirs at the ports. Conditions were often very poor.

Attempts were also made throughout the British Empire to reform the practice of slaughter itself, as the methods used came under increasing criticism for causing undue pain to the animals. The eminent physician, Benjamin Ward Richardson, spent many years in developing more humane methods of slaughter. He brought into use no fewer than fourteen possible anesthetics for use in the slaughterhouse and even experimented with the use of electric current at the Royal Polytechnic Institution. As early as 1853, he designed a lethal chamber that would gas animals to death relatively painlessly, and he founded the Model Abattoir Society in 1882 to investigate and campaign for humane methods of slaughter.

The invention of refrigeration and the expansion of transportation networks by sea and rail allowed for the safe exportation of meat around the world. Additionally, meat-packing millionaire Philip Danforth Armour's invention of the "disassembly line" greatly increased the productivity and profit margin of the meat packing industry: "according to some, animal slaughtering became the first mass-production industry in the United States." This expansion has been accompanied by increased concern about the physical and mental conditions of the workers along with controversy over the ethical and environmental implications of slaughtering animals for meat.

The Edinburgh abattoir, which was built in 1910, had well lit laboratories, hot and cold water, gas, microscopes and equipment for cultivating organisms. The English 1924 Public Health (Meat) Regulations required notification of slaughter to enable inspection of carcasses and enabled inspected carcasses to be marked.

The development of slaughterhouses was linked with industrial expansion of by-products. By 1932 the British by-product industry was worth about £97 million a year, employing 310,000 people. The Aberdeen slaughterhouse sent hooves to Lancashire to make glue, intestines to Glasgow for sausages and hides to the Midland tanneries. In January 1940 the British government took over the 16,000 slaughterhouses and by 1942 there were only 779.

== Design ==
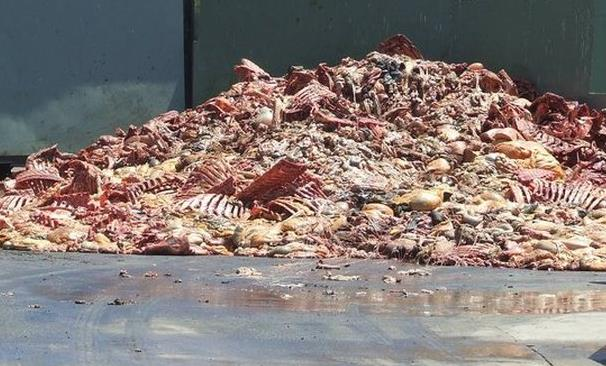
Slaughterhouse waste

In the latter part of the 20th century, the layout and design of most U.S. slaughterhouses was influenced by the work of Temple Grandin. She suggested that reducing the stress of animals being led to slaughter may help slaughterhouse operators improve efficiency and profit. In particular she applied an understanding of animal psychology to design pens and corrals which funnel a herd of animals arriving at a slaughterhouse into a single file ready for slaughter. Her corrals employ long sweeping curves so that each animal is prevented from seeing what lies ahead and just concentrates on the hind quarters of the animal in front of it. This design – along with the design elements of solid sides, solid crowd gate, and reduced noise at the end point – work together to encourage animals forward in the chute and to not reverse direction.

=== Mobile design ===
Beginning in 2008 the Local Infrastructure for Local Agriculture, a non-profit committed to revitalizing opportunities for "small farmers and strengthening the connection between local supply and demand", constructed a mobile slaughterhouse facility in efforts for small farmers to process meat quickly and cost effectively. Named the Modular Harvest System, or M.H.S., it received USDA approval in 2010. The M.H.S. consists of three separate trailers: One for slaughtering, one for consumable body parts, and one for other body parts. Preparation of individual cuts is done at a butchery or other meat preparation facility.

== International variations ==
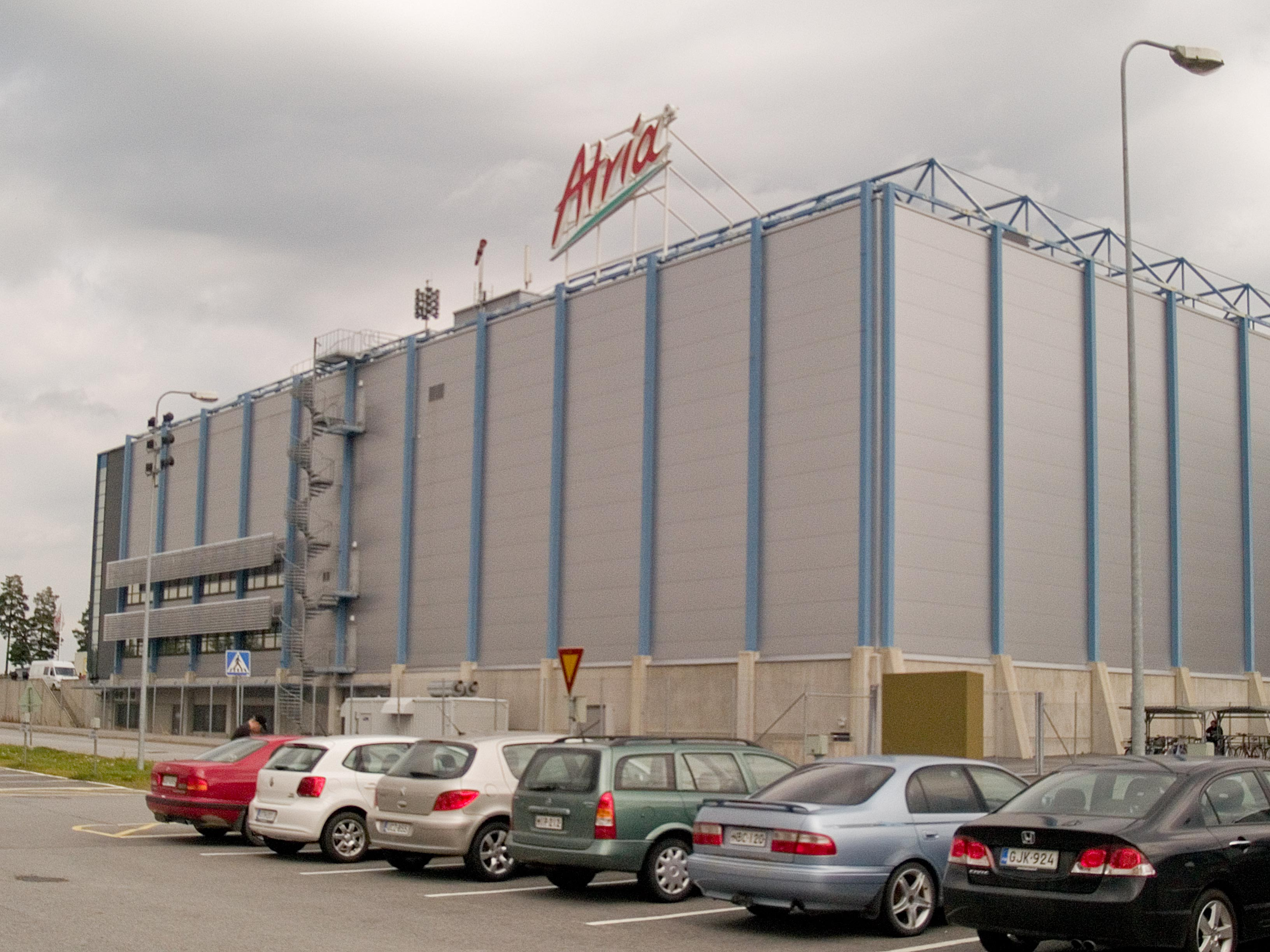
A slaughterhouse of Atria Oyj in Seinäjoki, Finland

A local slaughterhouse in Kawo (Kaduna), Nigeria

The standards and regulations governing slaughterhouses vary considerably around the world. In many countries the slaughter of animals is regulated by custom and tradition rather than by law. In the non-Western world, including the Arab world, the Indian sub-continent, etc., both forms of meat are available: one which is produced in modern mechanized slaughterhouses, and the other from local butcher shops.

In some communities animal slaughter and permitted species may be controlled by religious laws, most notably halal for Muslims and kashrut for Jewish communities. This can cause conflicts with national regulations when a slaughterhouse adhering to the rules of religious preparation is located in some Western countries. In Jewish law, captive bolts and other methods of pre-slaughter paralysis are generally not permissible, due to it being forbidden for an animal to be stunned prior to slaughter. Various halal food authorities have more recently permitted the use of a recently developed fail-safe system of head-only stunning where the shock is non-fatal, and where it is possible to reverse the procedure and revive the animal after the shock. The use of electronarcosis and other methods of dulling the sensing has been approved by the Egyptian Fatwa Committee. This allows these entities to continue their religious techniques while keeping accordance to the national regulations.

In some societies, traditional cultural and religious aversion to slaughter led to prejudice against the people involved. In Japan, where the ban on slaughter of livestock for food was lifted in the late 19th century, the newly found slaughter industry drew workers primarily from villages of burakumin, who traditionally worked in occupations relating to death (such as executioners and undertakers). In some parts of western Japan, prejudice faced by current and former residents of such areas (burakumin "hamlet people") is still a sensitive issue. Because of this, even the Japanese word for "slaughter" (屠殺, tosatsu) is deemed politically incorrect by some pressure groups as its inclusion of the kanji for "kill" (殺) supposedly portrays those who practise it in a negative manner.

Some countries have laws that exclude specific animal species or grades of animal from being slaughtered for human consumption, especially those that are taboo food. The former Indian Prime Minister Atal Bihari Vajpayee suggested in 2004 introducing legislation banning the slaughter of cows throughout India, as Hinduism holds cows as sacred and considers their slaughter unthinkable and offensive. This was often opposed on grounds of religious freedom. The slaughter of cows and the importation of beef into the nation of Nepal are strictly forbidden.

== Preservation techniques ==
Refrigeration technology allowed meat from the slaughterhouse to be preserved for longer periods. This led to the concept of the slaughterhouse as a freezing works. Prior to this, canning was an option. Freezing works are common in New Zealand, Australia and South Africa. In countries where meat is exported for a substantial profit the freezing works were built near docks, or near transport infrastructure.

Mobile poultry processing units (MPPUs) follow the same principles, but typically require only one trailer and, in much of the United States, may legally operate under USDA exemptions not available to red meat processors. Several MPPUs have been in operation since before 2010, under various models of operation and ownership.

== Law ==
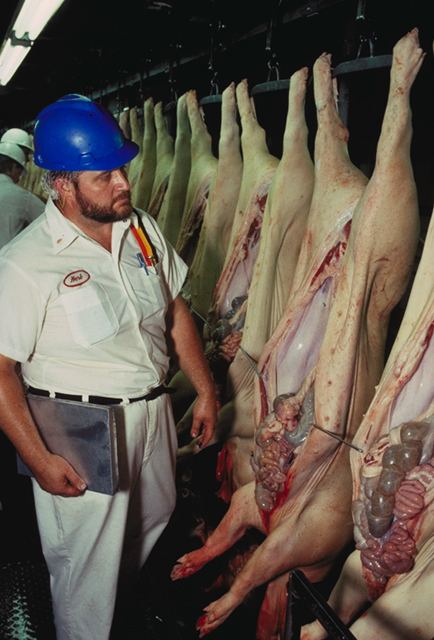
USDA inspection of pig carcasses

Most countries have laws in regard to the treatment of animals in slaughterhouses. In the United States, there is the Humane Slaughter Act of 1958, a law requiring that all swine, sheep, cattle, and horses be stunned unconscious with application of a stunning device by a trained person before being hoisted up on the line. There is some debate over the enforcement of this act. This act, like those in many countries, exempts slaughter in accordance to religious law, such as kosher shechita and dhabiha halal. Most strict interpretations of kashrut require that the animal be fully sensible when its carotid artery is cut.

The novel The Jungle presented a fictionalized account of unsanitary conditions in slaughterhouses and the meatpacking industry during the 1800s. This led directly to an investigation commissioned directly by President Theodore Roosevelt, and to the passage of the Meat Inspection Act and the Pure Food and Drug Act of 1906, which established the Food and Drug Administration. A much larger body of regulation deals with the public health and worker safety regulation and inspection.

== Animal welfare concerns ==
In 1985, Gail Eisnitz, chief investigator for the Humane Farming Association (HFA), released the book Slaughterhouse. It includes interviews of slaughterhouse workers in the U.S. who say that, because of the speed with which they are required to work, animals are routinely skinned while apparently alive and still blinking, kicking and shrieking. Eisnitz argues that this is not only cruel to the animals but also dangerous for the human workers, as cows weighing several thousands of pounds thrashing around in pain are likely to kick out and debilitate anyone working near them.

This would imply that certain slaughterhouses throughout the country are not following the guidelines and regulations spelled out by the Humane Slaughter Act, requiring all animals to be put down by some form, typically electronarcosis, and thus insusceptible to pain before being subjected to any form of violent action.

According to the HFA, Eiznitz interviewed slaughterhouse workers representing over two million hours of experience, who, without exception, told her that they have beaten, strangled, boiled and dismembered animals alive or have failed to report those who do. The workers described the effects the violence has had on their personal lives, with several admitting to being physically abusive or taking to alcohol and other drugs.

The HFA alleges that workers are required to kill up to 1,100 hogs an hour and end up taking their frustration out on the animals. Eisnitz interviewed one worker, who had worked in ten slaughterhouses, about pig production. He told her:

Hogs get stressed out pretty easy. If you prod them too much, they have heart attacks. If you get a hog in the chute that's had the shit prodded out of him and has a heart attack or refuses to move, you take a meat hook and hook it into his bunghole. You try to do this by clipping the hipbone. Then you drag him backwards. You're dragging these hogs alive, and a lot of times the meat hook rips out of the bunghole. I've seen hams – thighs – completely ripped open. I've also seen intestines come out. If the hog collapses near the front of the chute, you shove the meat hook into his cheek and drag him forward.

Animal rights activists, anti-speciesists, vegetarians and vegans are prominent critics of slaughterhouses and have created events such as the march to close all slaughterhouses to voice concerns about the conditions in slaughterhouses and ask for their abolition. Some have argued that humane animal slaughter is impossible.

== Worker exploitation concerns ==
=== Slaughterhouse mortality impact ===
American slaughterhouse workers are three times more likely to suffer serious injury than the average American worker. NPR reports that pig and cattle slaughterhouse workers are nearly seven times more likely to suffer repetitive strain injuries than average. The Guardian reports that on average there are two amputations a week involving slaughterhouse workers in the United States. On average, one employee of Tyson Foods, the largest meat producer in America, is injured and amputates a finger or limb per month. The Bureau of Investigative Journalism reported that over a period of six years, in the UK 78 slaughter workers lost fingers, parts of fingers or limbs, more than 800 workers had serious injuries, and at least 4,500 had to take more than three days off after accidents. In a 2018 study in the Italian Journal of Food Safety, slaughterhouse workers are instructed to wear ear protectors to protect their hearing from the loud noises in the facility. A 2004 study in the Journal of Occupational and Environmental Medicine found that "excess risks were observed for mortality from all causes, all cancers, and lung cancer" in workers employed in the New Zealand meat processing industry.

=== Psychological impact ===
The worst thing, worse than the physical danger, is the emotional toll. If you work in the stick pit [where hogs are killed] for any period of time – that lets you kill things but doesn't let you care. You may look a hog in the eye that's walking around in the blood pit with you and think, "God, that really isn't a bad looking animal." You may want to pet it. Pigs down on the kill floor have come up to nuzzle me like a puppy. Two minutes later I had to kill them – beat them to death with a pipe. I can't care.

— Gail A. Eisnitz,

Slaughterhouse workers have a higher prevalence rate of mental health distress, including anxiety, detachment, depression, emotional numbing, perpetrator trauma, psychosocial distress, and PTSD, violence-supportive attitudes, and an increased crime levels. Slaughterhouse workers have adaptive and maladaptive strategies to cope with the workplace environment and associated stressors.

Working at slaughterhouses often leads to a high amount of psychological trauma. A 2016 study in Organization indicates, "Regression analyses of data from 10,605 Danish workers across 44 occupations suggest that slaughterhouse workers consistently experience lower physical and psychological well-being along with increased incidences of negative coping behavior." A 2009 study by criminologist Amy Fitzgerald indicates, "slaughterhouse employment increases total arrest rates, arrests for violent crimes, arrests for rape, and arrests for other sex offenses in comparison with other industries." As authors from the PTSD Journal explain, "These employees are hired to kill animals, such as pigs and cows that are largely gentle creatures. Carrying out this action requires workers to disconnect from what they are doing and from the creature standing before them. This emotional dissonance can lead to consequences such as domestic violence, social withdrawal, anxiety, drug and alcohol abuse, and PTSD."

=== Working conditions ===
Starting in the 1980s, Cargill, Conagra Brands, Tyson Foods and other large food companies moved most slaughterhouse operations to rural areas of the Southern United States which were more hostile to unionization efforts. Slaughterhouses in the United States commonly illegally employ and exploit underage workers and undocumented immigrants. In 2010, Human Rights Watch described slaughterhouse line work in the United States as a human rights crime. In a report by Oxfam America, slaughterhouse workers were observed not being allowed breaks, were often required to wear diapers, and were paid below minimum wage.

== See also ==
- Continuous inspection
- Controlled-atmosphere killing (CAK)
- Cultured meat
- Dog meat
- Mad cow crisis
- Meat cutter
- Meat processing
- Pig slaughter
- Pig scalder
- Weasand clip
