= Food Safety Institute of the Americas =

The Food Safety Institute of the Americas (FSIA) is a cooperative educational and research organization established in 2004 to promote food safety and identify and develop educational programs in the Western Hemisphere. It is part of the Food Safety and Inspection Service of the United States Department of Agriculture and is based in the Claude Pepper Federal Building in Miami, Florida.

FSIA cooperates with the University of Florida, Miami-Dade College, Pan American Health Organization, and agriculture and food safety agencies in various countries in the Americas.
