= Livestock =

Animals kept to produce material goods

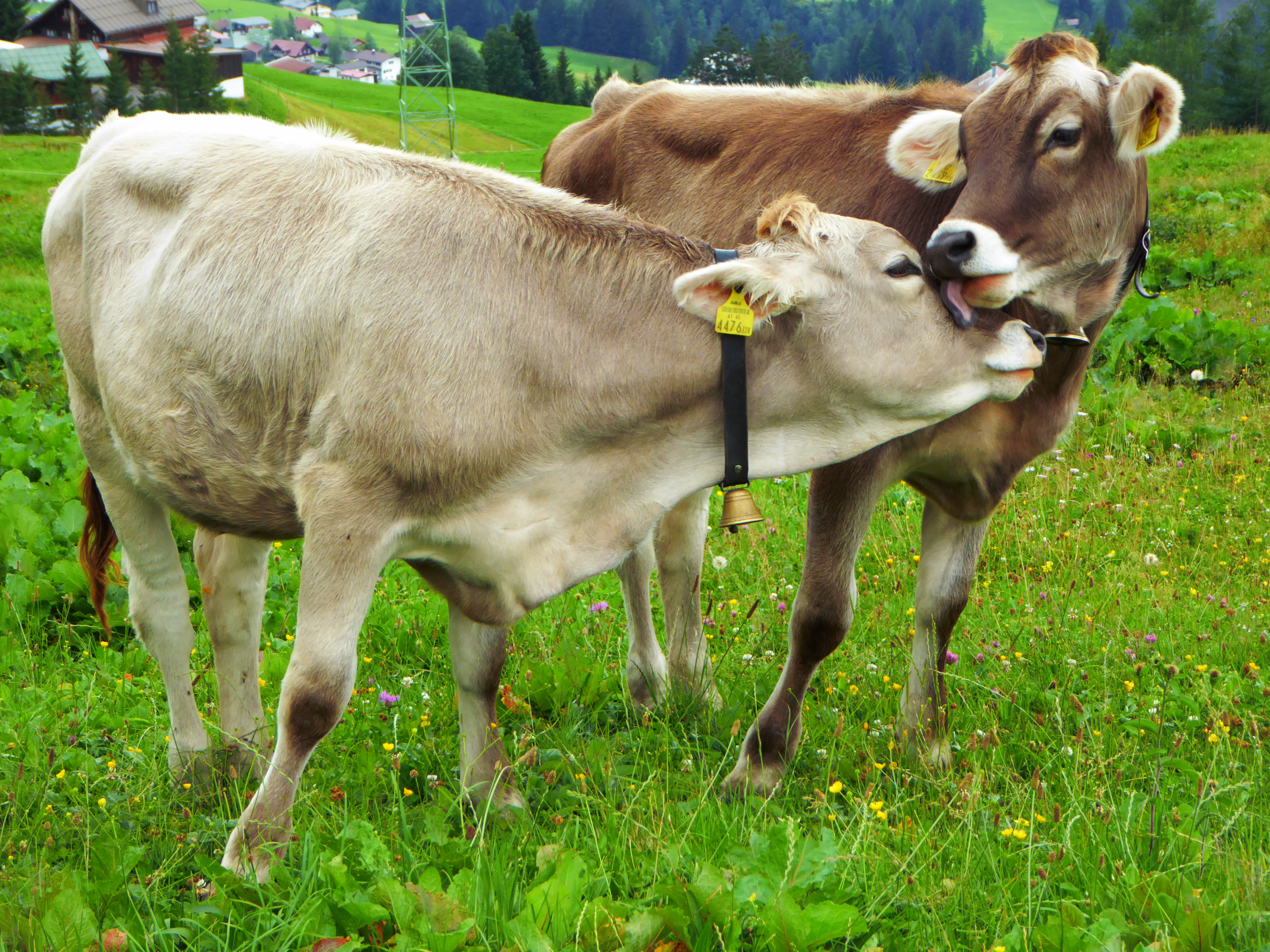
Cows on a pasture in Austria

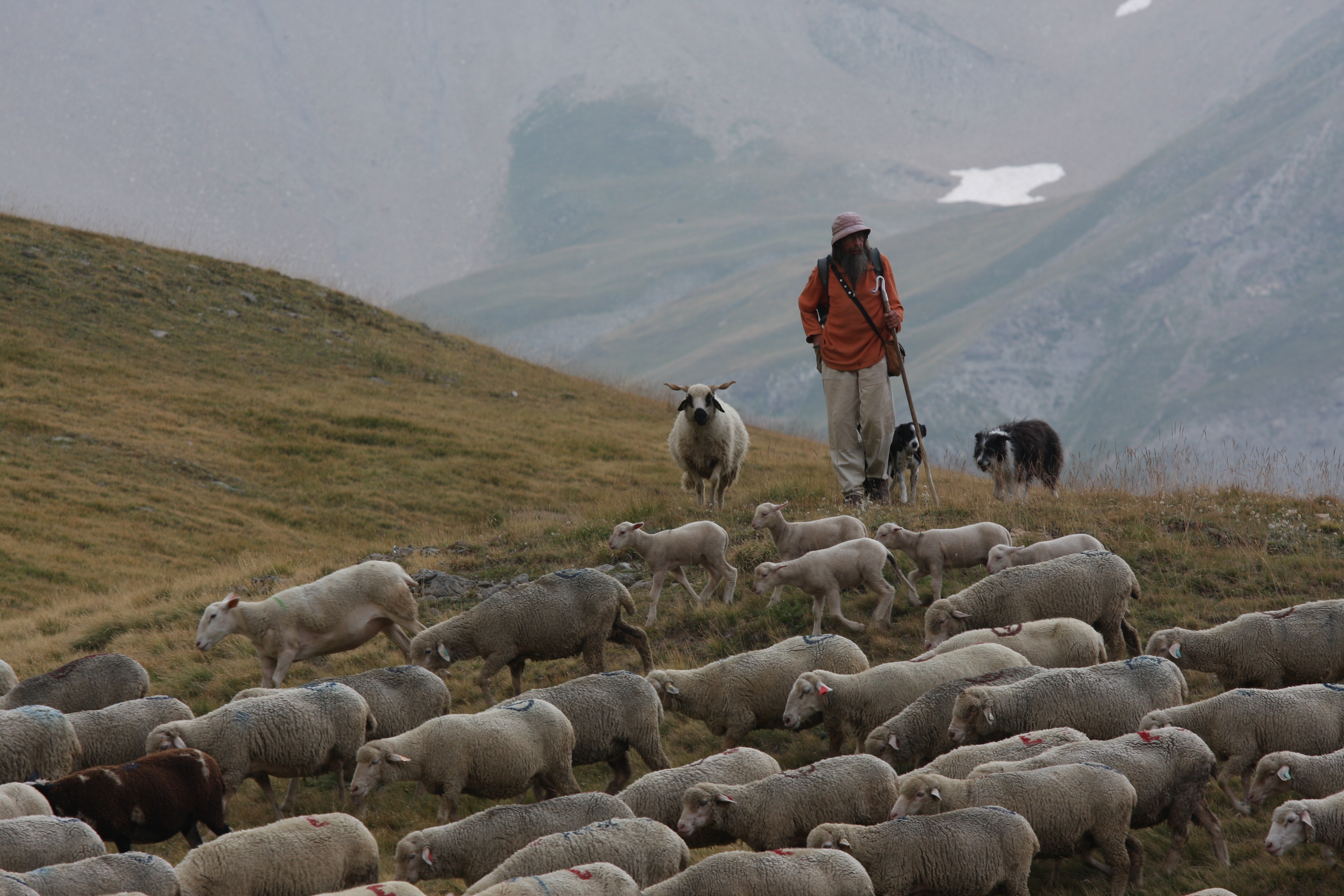
Sheep in (Europe)

Livestock are the domesticated animals that are raised in an agricultural setting mainly to provide labor and produce diversified animal products for human consumption such as meat, eggs, milk, fur, leather, and wool. The term is sometimes used to refer solely to animals which are raised for consumption, and sometimes used to refer solely to farmed ruminants, such as cattle, sheep, and goats.

The breeding, maintenance, slaughter and general subjugation of livestock, called animal husbandry, is a part of modern agriculture and has been practiced in many cultures since humanity's transition to farming from hunter-gatherer lifestyles. Animal husbandry practices have varied widely across cultures and periods. They continue to play a major economic and cultural role in numerous communities.

Livestock farming practices have largely shifted to intensive animal farming. Such farming increases the yield of the various commercial outputs, but also impairs animal welfare, the environment, and public health. In particular, beef, dairy and sheep are an outsized source of greenhouse gas emissions from agriculture.

== Etymology ==
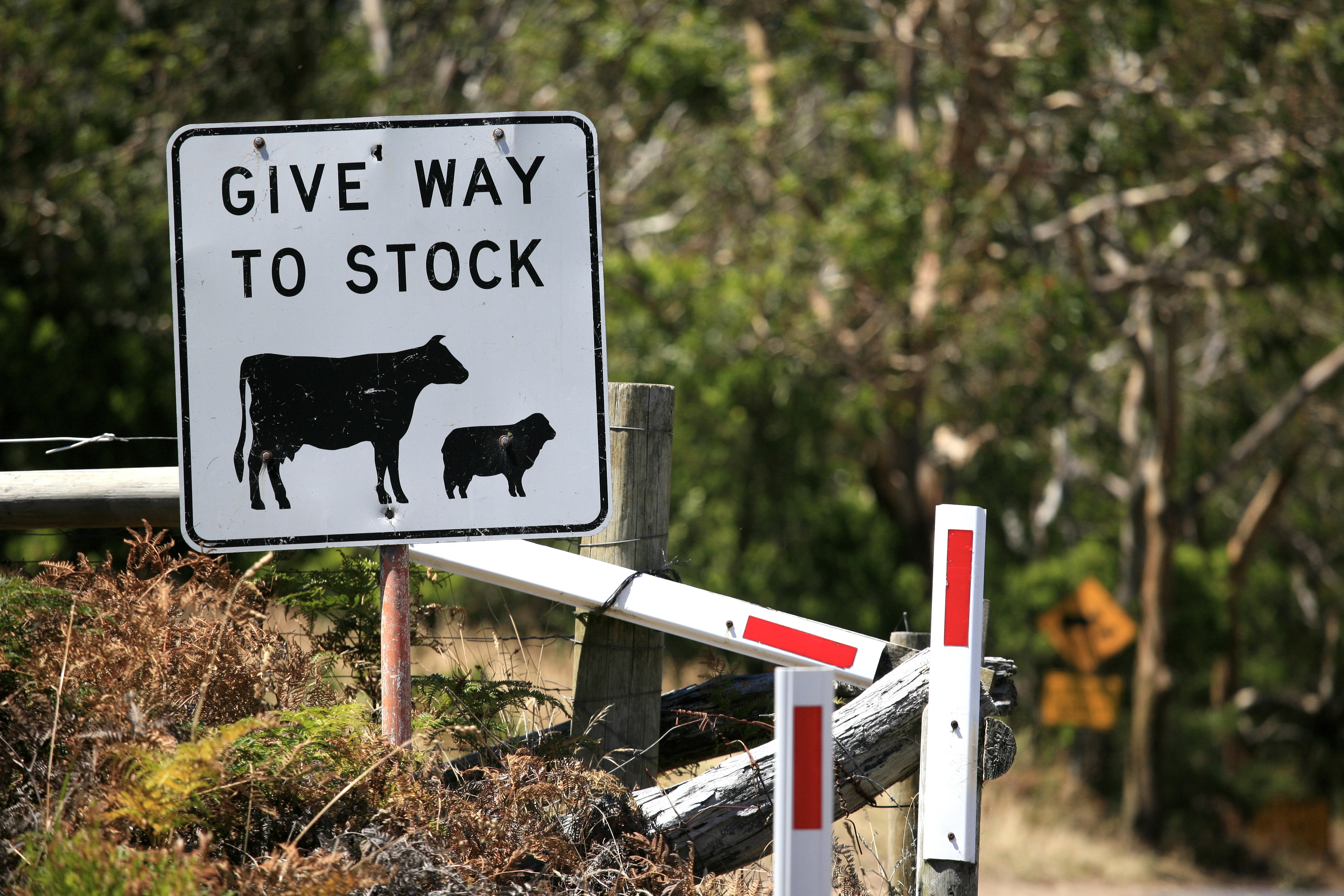
This Australian road sign uses the less common term "stock" for livestock.

The word livestock was first used between 1650 and 1660, as a compound word combining the words "live" and "stock". In some periods, "cattle" and "livestock" have been used interchangeably. Over the 19th century, the meaning of livestock and cattle shifted, leading to the modern meaning of cattle referring to domesticated bovines, whilst livestock is used in a wider sense. United States federal legislation defines the term to make specified agricultural commodities eligible or ineligible for a program or activity. For example, the Livestock Mandatory Reporting Act of 1999 (P.L. 106–78, Title IX) defines livestock only as cattle, swine, and sheep, while the 1988 disaster assistance legislation defined the term as "cattle, sheep, goats, swine, poultry (including egg-producing poultry), equine animals used for food or in the production of food, fish used for food, and other animals designated by the Secretary".

Horses are considered livestock in the United States. The USDA classifies pork, veal (meat of young cows, usually 5–8 months old), beef, and lamb (mutton) as livestock, and all livestock as red meat. Poultry and fish are not included in the category. The latter is likely because fish products are not governed by the USDA, but by the FDA.

Deadstock is defined in contradistinction to or as the opposite of livestock as "animals that have died before slaughter, sometimes from illness or disease". It is illegal in many countries, such as Canada, to sell or process meat from dead animals for human consumption.

== History ==
Animal-rearing originated during the cultural transition to settled farming communities from hunter-gatherer lifestyles. Animals are domesticated when their breeding and living conditions are controlled by humans. Over time, the collective behaviour, lifecycle and physiology of livestock have changed radically. Many modern farmed animals are unsuited to life in the natural world.

Dogs were domesticated early; dogs appear in Europe and the Far East from about 15,000 years ago. Goats and sheep were domesticated in multiple events sometime between 11,000 and 5,000 years ago in Southwest Asia. Pigs were domesticated by 8,500 BC in the Near East and 6,000 BC in China. Domestication of horses dates to around 4,000 BC. Cattle have been domesticated since approximately 10,500 years ago. Chickens and other poultry may have been domesticated around 7,000 BC.

== Types ==
The term "livestock" is indistinct and may be defined narrowly or broadly. Broadly, livestock refers to any population of animals kept by humans for a useful, commercial purpose.

Animal	Ancestor	Domestication	Utilization	Picture
Horse	Tarpan	Eurasia	Riding, racing, carrying and pulling loads, meat, milk	
Donkey	African wild ass	Africa	Carrying loads and draught	
Cow	Eurasian aurochs	Eurasia	Meat, milk and draught	
Zebu	Indian aurochs	Eurasia	Milk, meat and draught	
Bali cattle	Banteng	SE Asia	Meat, milk and draught	
Yak	Wild yak	Tibet	Pack animals, milk, meat and hide	
Water buffalo	Wild water buffalo	India and SE Asia	Meat, milk and carrying loads	
Gayal	Gaur	India and Malaysia	Carrying loads and draught	
Sheep	Mouflon	Iran and Asia Minor	Meat, milk and fleece.	
Goat	Bezoar ibex	Greece and Pakistan	Meat, milk and fleece	
Reindeer	Reindeer	Eurasia	Draught, milk, flesh and hide	
Bactrian camel	Wild Bactrian camel	Central Asia	Riding, racing, meat, milk and fur	
Arabian camel	Thomas' camel	North Africa and SW Asia	Riding, racing, meat and milk	
Llama	Guanaco	Andes	Pack animals, meat, fleece	
Alpaca	vicuña	Andes	Meat, fleece	
Domestic Pig	Wild boar	Eurasia	Meat, Companionship, truffle hunting	
Domestic Dog	Wolf	Eurasia and North America	Companionship, hunting	
Chicken	red junglefowl	Southeast Asia	Meat, egg	
Domestic duck	Mallard	Southern China	Meat, egg	
Domestic goose	Greylag goose, swan goose	Egypt, Siberia	Meat, egg	
Domestic turkey	Wild turkey	Central Mexico	Meat, egg	
Domestic guinea fowl	Helmeted guinea fowl	North Africa	Meat, egg	
Rabbit	European rabbit	Europe	Meat, wool, fur	
Guinea pig	Montane guinea pig	Andes	Meat	

=== Micro-livestock ===
Micro-livestock is the term used for much-smaller animals, usually mammals. The two predominant categories are rodents and lagomorphs (rabbits). Even-smaller animals are kept and raised, such as crickets and honey bees. Micro-livestock does not generally include fish (aquaculture), but does include poultry (poultry farming).

== Farming practices ==
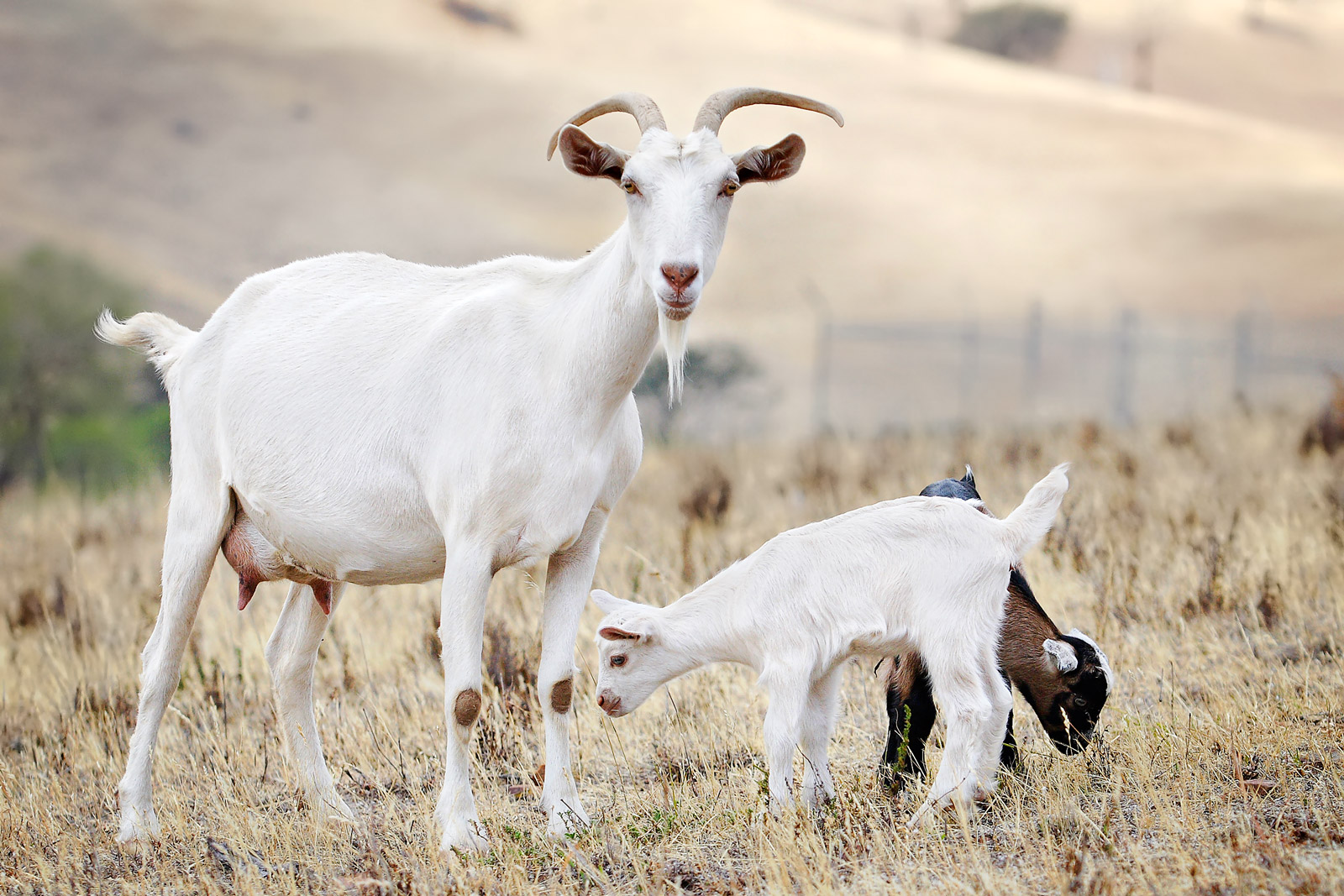
Goat family with one-week-old kid

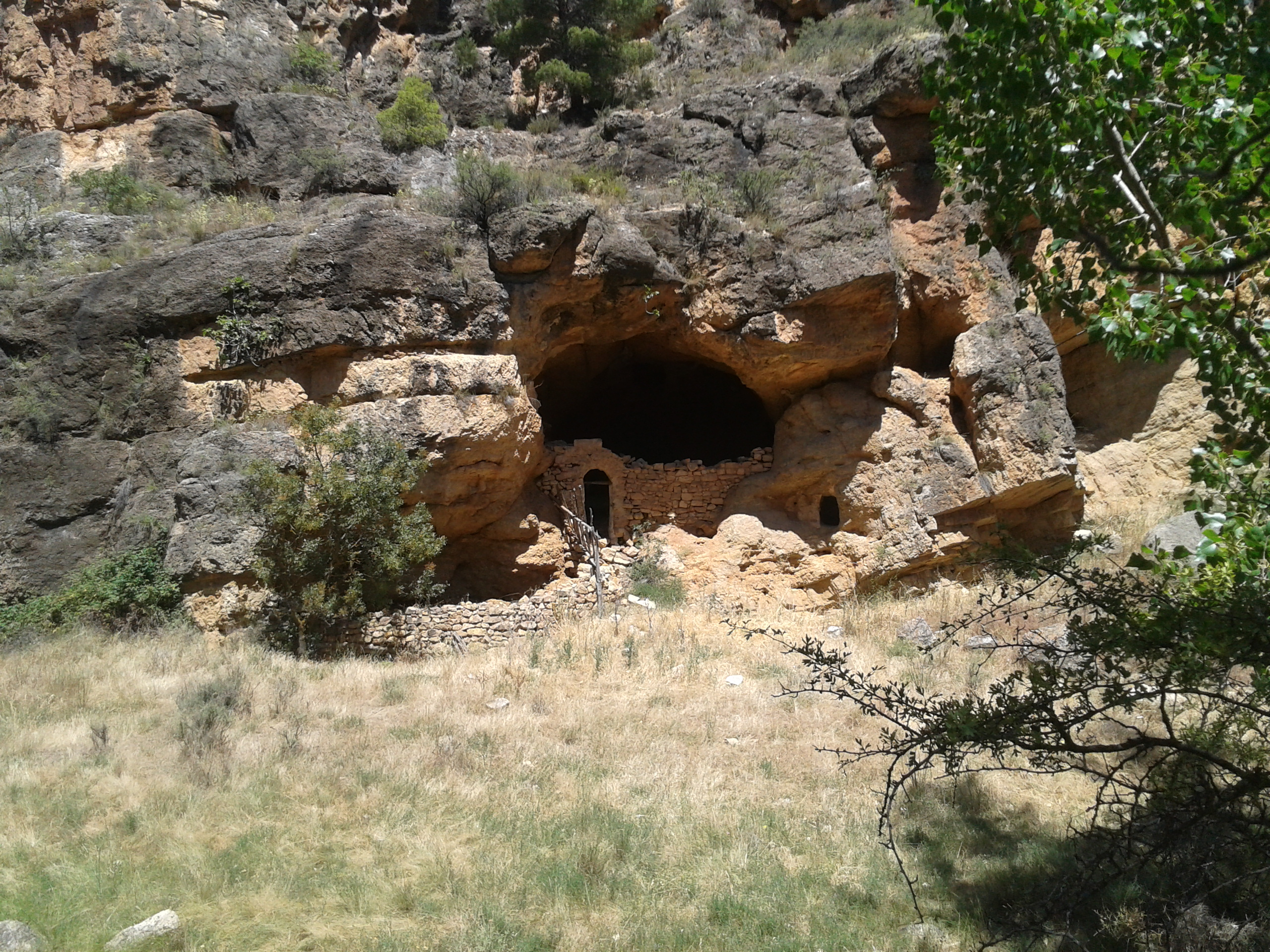
Farrowing site in a natural cave in northern Spain

Traditionally, animal husbandry was part of the subsistence farmer's way of life, producing not only the food needed by the family but also the fuel, fertiliser, clothing, transport and draught power. Killing the animal for food was a secondary consideration, and wherever possible their products, such as wool, eggs, milk and blood (by the Maasai) were harvested while the animal was still alive.

In the traditional system of transhumance, humans and livestock moved seasonally between fixed summer and winter pastures; in montane regions the summer pasture was up in the mountains, the winter pasture in the valleys.

Animals can be kept extensively or intensively. Extensive systems involve animals roaming at will, or under the supervision of a herdsman, often for their protection from predators. Ranching in the Western United States involves large herds of cattle grazing widely over public and private lands. Similar cattle stations are found in South America, Australia and other places with large areas of land and low rainfall. Ranching systems have been used for sheep, deer, ostrich, emu, llama and alpaca. In the uplands of the United Kingdom, sheep are turned out on the fells in spring and graze the abundant mountain grasses untended, being brought to lower altitudes late in the year, with supplementary feeding being provided in winter.

In rural locations, pigs and poultry can obtain much of their nutrition from scavenging, and in African communities, hens may live for months without being fed, and still produce one or two eggs a week. At the other extreme, in the more Western parts of the world, animals are often intensively managed; dairy cows may be kept in zero-grazing conditions with all their forage brought to them; beef cattle may be kept in high density feedlots; pigs may be housed in climate-controlled buildings and never go outdoors; poultry may be reared in barns and kept in cages as laying birds under lighting-controlled conditions. In between these two extremes are semi-intensive, often family-run farms where livestock graze outside for much of the year, silage or hay is made to cover the times of year when the grass stops growing, and fertiliser, feed and other inputs are bought onto the farm from outside.

== Predation ==
Livestock farmers have often dealt with natural world animals' predation and theft by rustlers. In North America, animals such as gray wolves, grizzly bears, cougars, and coyotes are sometimes considered a threat to livestock. In Eurasia and Africa, predators include wolves, leopards, tigers, lions, dholes, Asiatic black bears, crocodiles, spotted hyenas, and other carnivores. In South America, feral dogs, jaguars, anacondas, and spectacled bears are threats to livestock. In Australia, dingoes, foxes, and wedge-tailed eagles are common predators, with an additional threat from domestic dogs who may kill in response to a hunting instinct, leaving the carcass uneaten.

== Disease ==
Good husbandry, proper feeding, and hygiene are the main contributors to animal health on farms, bringing economic benefits through maximised production. When, despite these precautions, animals still become sick, they are treated with veterinary medicines, by the farmer and the veterinarian. In the European Union, when farmers treat the animals, they are required to follow the guidelines for treatment and to record the treatments given.

Animals are susceptible to a number of diseases and conditions that may affect their health. Some, like classical swine fever and scrapie are specific to one population of animals, while others, like foot-and-mouth disease affect all cloven-hoofed animals. Where the condition is serious, governments impose regulations on import and export, on the movement of livestock, quarantine restrictions and the reporting of suspected cases. Vaccines are available against certain diseases, and antibiotics are widely used where appropriate.

At one time, antibiotics were routinely added to certain compound foodstuffs to promote growth, but this is now considered poor practice in many countries because of the risk that it may lead to antibiotic resistance. Animals living under intensive conditions are particularly prone to internal and external parasites; increasing numbers of sea lice are affecting farmed salmon in Scotland. Reducing the parasite burdens of livestock results in increased productivity and profitability.

According to the Special Report on Climate Change and Land, livestock diseases are expected to get worse as climate change increases temperature and precipitation variability.

== Transportation and marketing ==
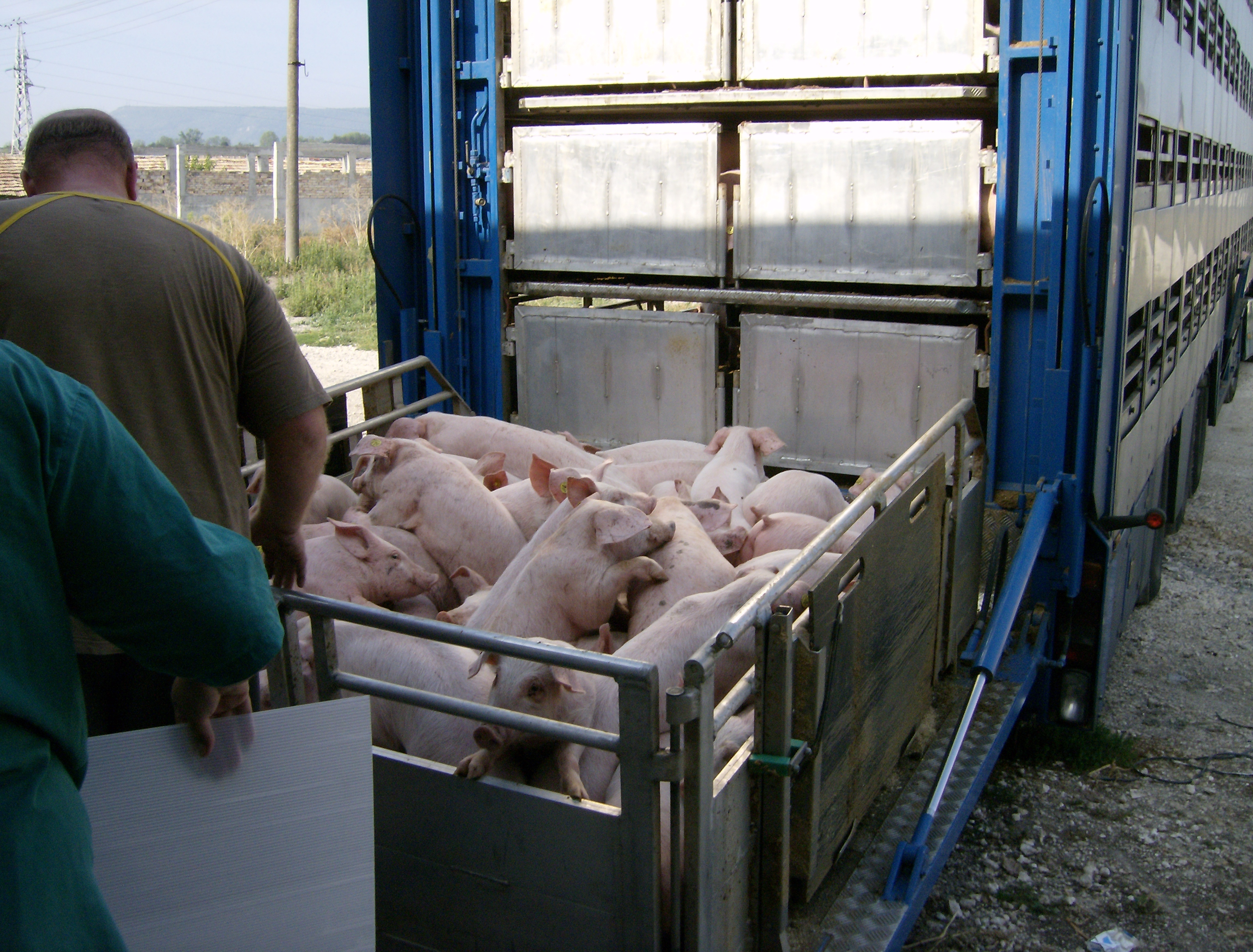
Pigs being loaded into their transport

Since many livestock are herd animals, they were historically driven to market "on the hoof" to a town or other central location. The method is still used in some parts of the world.

Truck transport is now common in developed countries.

Local and regional livestock auctions and specialized agricultural markets facilitate trade in livestock. In Canada at the Cargill slaughterhouse in High River, Alberta, 2,000 workers process 4,500 cattle per day, or more than one-third of Canada's capacity. It closed when some of its workers became infected with coronavirus disease 2019. The Cargill plant together with the JBS plant in Brooks, Alberta and the Harmony Beef plant in Balzac, Alberta represent fully three-quarters of the Canadian beef supply. In other areas, livestock may be bought and sold in a bazaar or wet market, such as may be found in many parts of Central Asia.

In non-Western countries, providing access to markets has encouraged farmers to invest in livestock, with the result being improved livelihoods. For example, the International Crops Research Institute for the Semi-Arid Tropics (ICRISAT) has worked in Zimbabwe to help farmers make their most of their livestock herds.

In stock shows, farmers bring their best livestock to compete with one another.

== Biomass ==
Biomass distribution of humans, livestock, and other animals

Humans and livestock make up more than 90% of the biomass of all terrestrial vertebrates, and almost as much as all insects combined.

== Economic and social benefits ==
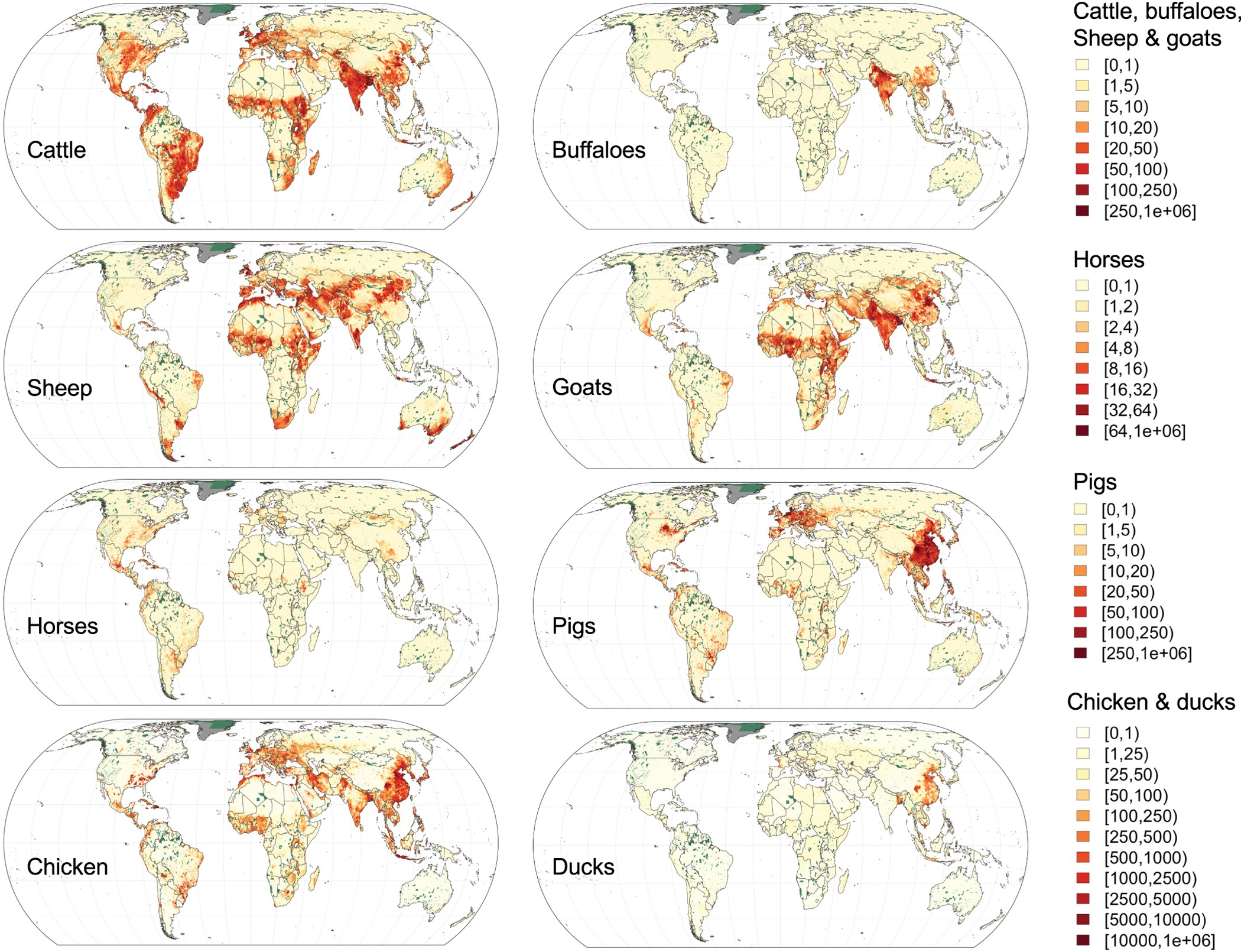
Global distribution data for cattle, buffaloes, horses, sheep, goats, pigs, chickens and ducks in 2010

The value of global livestock production in 2013 has been estimated at 883 billion dollars, (constant 2005–2006 dollars). However, economic implications of livestock production extend further: to downstream industry (saleyards, abattoirs, butchers, milk processors, refrigerated transport, wholesalers, retailers, food services, tanneries, etc.), upstream industry (feed producers, feed transport, farm and ranch supply companies, equipment manufacturers, seed companies, vaccine manufacturers, etc.) and associated services (veterinarians, nutrition consultants, shearers, etc.).

Livestock provide a variety of food and non-food products; the latter include leather, wool, pharmaceuticals, bone products, industrial protein, and fats. For many abattoirs, very little animal biomass may be wasted at slaughter. Even intestinal contents removed at slaughter may be recovered for use as fertilizer. Livestock manure helps maintain the fertility of grazing lands. Manure is commonly collected from barns and feeding areas to fertilize cropland due to its nutrient rich content, however, can pose some biosecurity and health risks. In some places, animal manure is used as fuel, either directly (as in some non-Western countries), or indirectly (as a source of methane for heating or for generating electricity). In regions where machine power is limited, some classes of livestock are used as draft stock, not only for tillage and other on-farm use, but also for transport of people and goods. In 1997, livestock provided energy for between an estimated 25 and 64% of cultivation energy in the world's irrigated systems, and that 300 million draft animals were used globally in small-scale agriculture.

Although livestock production serves as a source of income, it can provide additional economic values for rural families, often serving as a major contributor to food security and economic security. Livestock can serve as insurance against risk and is an economic buffer (of income and food supply) in some regions and some economies (e.g., during some African droughts). However, its use as a buffer may sometimes be limited where alternatives are present, which may reflect strategic maintenance of insurance in addition to a desire to retain productive assets. Even for some farmers in Western nations, livestock can serve as a kind of insurance. Some crop growers may produce livestock as a strategy for diversification of their income sources, to reduce risks related to weather, markets and other factors.

Many studies have found evidence of the social, as well as economic, importance of livestock in non-Western countries and in regions of rural poverty, and such evidence is not confined to pastoral and nomadic societies.

Social values in developed countries can also be considerable. For example, in a study of livestock ranching permitted on national forest land in New Mexico, US, it was concluded that "ranching maintains traditional values and connects families to ancestral lands and cultural heritage", and that a "sense of place, attachment to land, and the value of preserving open space were common themes". "The importance of land and animals as means of maintaining culture and way of life figured repeatedly in permittee responses, as did the subjects of responsibility and respect for land, animals, family, and community."

In the US, profit tends to rank low among motivations for involvement in livestock ranching. Instead, family, tradition and a desired way of life tend to be major motivators for ranch purchase, and ranchers "historically have been willing to accept low returns from livestock production".

== Environmental impact ==
Mean greenhouse gas emissions for different food types
Food Types	Greenhouse Gas Emissions (g CO2-Ceq per g protein)
Ruminant Meat	62
Recirculating Aquaculture	30
Trawling Fishery	26
Non-recirculating Aquaculture	12
Pork	10
Poultry	10
Dairy	9.1
Non-trawling Fishery	8.6
Eggs	6.8
Starchy Roots	1.7
Wheat	1.2
Maize	1.2
Legumes	0.25

Animal husbandry has a significant impact on the world environment. It is responsible for somewhere between 20 and 33% of the fresh water usage in the world, and livestock, and the production of feed for them, occupy about a third of Earth's ice-free land. Livestock production is a contributing factor in species extinction, desertification, and habitat destruction. Meat is considered one of the prime factors contributing to the current sixth mass extinction. Animal agriculture contributes to species extinction in various ways. Habitat is destroyed by clearing forests and converting land to grow feed crops and for animal grazing (for example, animal husbandry is responsible for up to 91% of the deforestation in the Amazon region), while predators and herbivores are frequently targeted and hunted because of a perceived threat to livestock profits. The newest report released by the Intergovernmental Panel on Climate Change (IPCC) states that between the 1970s and 2000s agricultural emission increases were directly linked to an increase in livestock. The population growth of livestock (including cattle, buffalo, sheep, and goats) is done with the intention of increasing animal production, but in turn increases emissions.

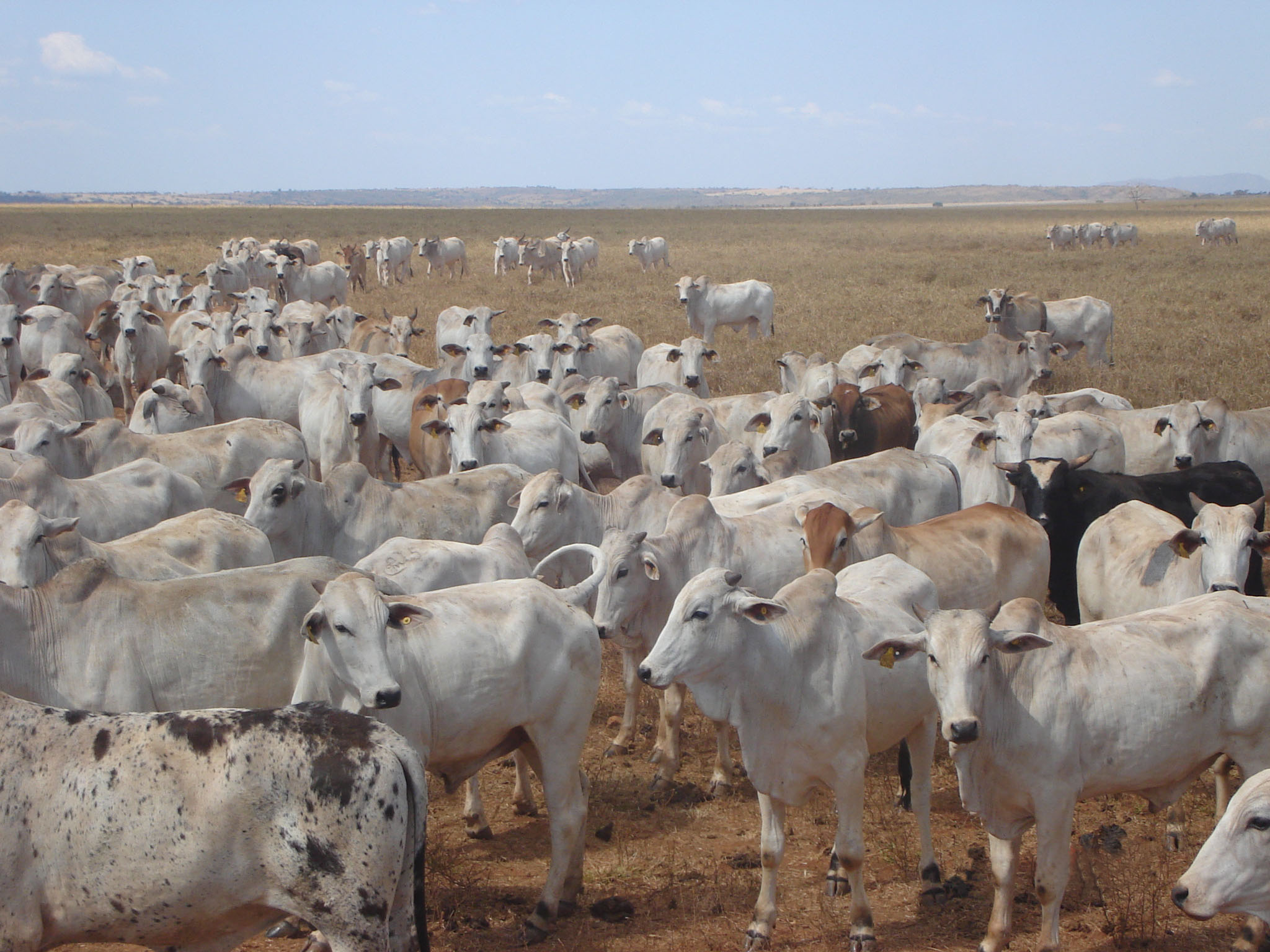
Livestock production requires large areas of land.

In addition, livestock produce greenhouse gases. The IPCC has estimated that agriculture (including not only livestock, but also food crop, biofuel and other production) accounted for about 10 to 12 percent of global anthropogenic greenhouse gas emissions (expressed as 100-year carbon dioxide equivalents) in 2005 and in 2010. Cattle produce some 79 million tons of methane per day. Live westock enteric methane account 30% of the overall methane emissions of the planet. Livestock are responsible for 34% of all human-related emissions of nitrous oxide, through feed production and manure..Best production practices are estimated to be able to reduce livestock emissions by 30%.

== Impacts of climate change ==
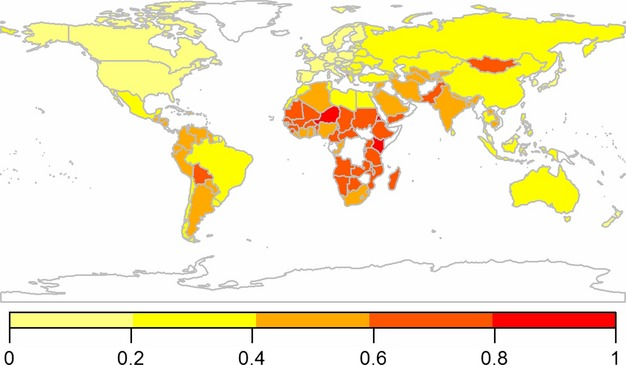
A map of countries considered most and least vulnerable to adverse impacts of climate change on their grazing livestock

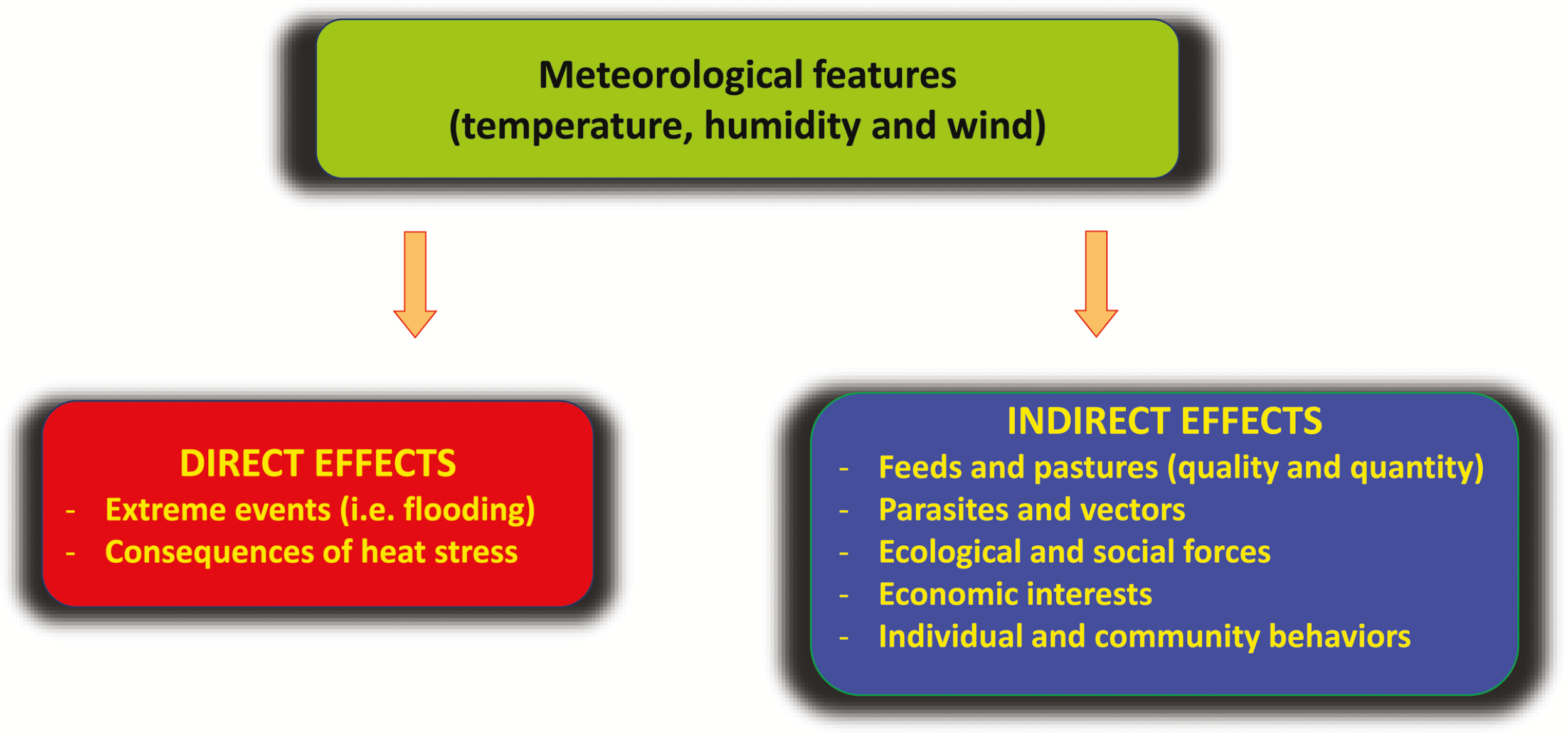
Multi-faceted impacts of climate change on livestock

There are numerous interlinked effects of climate change on livestock rearing. This activity is both heavily affected by and a substantial driver of anthropogenic climate change due to its greenhouse gas emissions. As of 2011, some 400 million people relied on livestock in some way to secure their livelihood. The commercial value of this sector is estimated as close to $1 trillion. As an outright end to human consumption of meat and animal products is not currently considered a realistic goal, any comprehensive adaptation to effects of climate change must also consider livestock.

The observed adverse impacts on livestock production include increased heat stress in all but the coldest nations. This causes both mass animal mortality during heatwaves, and the sublethal impacts, such as lower quantity of quality of products like milk, greater vulnerability to conditions like lameness or even impaired reproduction. Another impact concerns reduced quantity or quality of animal feed, whether due to drought or as a secondary impact of CO2 fertilization effect. Difficulties with growing feed could reduce worldwide livestock headcounts by 7–10% by midcentury. Animal parasites and vector-borne diseases are also spreading further than they had before, and the data indicating this is frequently of superior quality to one used to estimate impacts on the spread of human pathogens.

While some areas which currently support livestock animals are expected to avoid "extreme heat stress" even with high warming at the end of the century, others may stop being suitable as early as midcentury. In general, sub-Saharan Africa is considered to be the most vulnerable region to food security shocks caused by the impacts of climate change on their livestock, as over 180 million people across those nations are expected to see significant declines in suitability of their rangelands around midcentury. On the other hand, Japan, the United States and nations in Europe are considered the least vulnerable. This is as much a product of pre-existing differences in human development index and other measures of national resilience and widely varying importance of pastoralism to the national diet as it is an outcome of direct impacts of climate on each country.

Proposed adaptations to climate change in livestock production include improved cooling at animal shelters and changes to animal feed, though they are often costly or have only limited effects. At the same time, livestock produces the majority of greenhouse gas emissions from agriculture and demands around 30% of agricultural fresh water needs, while only supplying 18% of the global calorie intake. Animal-derived food plays a larger role in meeting human protein needs, yet is still a minority of supply at 39%, with crops providing the rest. Consequently, plans for limiting global warming to lower levels like 1.5 °C (2.7 °F) or 2 °C (3.6 °F) assume animal-derived food will play a lower role in the global diets relative to now. As such, net zero transition plans now involve limits on total livestock headcounts (including reductions of already disproportionately large stocks in countries like Ireland), and there have been calls for phasing out subsidies currently offered to livestock farmers in many places worldwide.

== Animal ethics ==
Animal ethics is a branch of ethics that examines human-animal relationships and the moral consideration of non-animals. Debates within the field address the moral implications of using animals for human consumption and the responsibilities humans have toward livestock.

It is estimated that worldwide, 74% of livestock are raised in factory farms, characterized by densely confined animals. Consumers are typically against intensive livestock farming when surveyed. A majority are unaware of routine controversial practices such as break trimming, separation of calves from their mothers and gas chamber slaughter. Three quarters of US adults surveyed believed the animal products they consumed came from animals that were treated "humanely".

Believing that livestock farming is cruel was cited as the most common reason for becoming vegan or vegetarian throughout the 2010s.

== See also ==
- Agribusiness
- Agroecology
- Amenable species
- Bovine spongiform encephalopathy
- California Proposition 2 (2008)
- Cryoconservation of animal genetic resources
- Cuniculture (rabbit farming)
- Leave the gate as you found it
- Livestock's Long Shadow – Environmental Issues and Options (UN report)
- Pen
- Sericulture (silkworm farming)
- Sheep husbandry
- Western Fair
- Wildlife farming
