= Amenable number =

Type of positive integer

An amenable number is a positive integer for which there exists a multiset of as many integers as the original number that both add up to the original number and when multiplied together give the original number. To put it algebraically, for a positive integer n, there is a multiset of n integers {a_{1}, ..., a_{n}}, for which the equalities
$$n = \sum_{i=1}^n a_i = \prod_{i=1}^n a_i$$
hold.

The amenable numbers were named in a 1995 problem posed by H. Tamvakis. Whether a number is amenable can be determined from its value modulo 4.

== Examples ==
For example, 5 is amenable since 5 = 1 + (−1) + 1 + (−1) + 5.

The first few amenable numbers are

1, 5, 8, 9, 12, 13 ... (sequence A100832 in the OEIS).

== Characterization ==
the amenable numbers consist exactly of the positive integers that are congruent to 0 or 1 modulo 4, and are not equal to 4.

For the integers of the form $n=4k+1$, where $k$ is itself an integer, a solution can be given by a set of $2k$ copies of $+1$, $2k$ copies of $-1$, and one copy of $n$, generalizing the example of 5 given above. For the integers of the form $n=4k$, with $k>1$, a solution can be given by $n-2$ copies of $\pm1$ and one copy each of $\pm 2$ and $2k$.

Four can be shown not to be amenable by case analysis. For numbers $n$ congruent to 2 mod 4, it is only possible for the product of $n$ integers to equal $n$ when there is a single even term, from which it follows that the sum of the terms is odd and therefore unequal to $n$. When $n$ is congruent to 3 mod 4, all terms must be odd and there must be an odd number of terms congruent to 3 mod 4, from which it follows that the sum is 1 mod 4 and unequal to $n$.

== Other properties ==
It follows from their characterization that the set of amenable numbers is closed under multiplication: the product of two amenable numbers is an amenable number.

== Related concepts ==
Amenable numbers should not be confused with amicable numbers, which are pairs of integers whose divisors add up to each other.
