= Continuous inspection =

USA food hygiene method

Continuous inspection (carcass-by-carcass inspection) is the USDA's meat and poultry inspection system, called "continuous" because no animal destined for human food may be slaughtered or dressed unless an inspector is continuously present. The inspector examines each animal before slaughter (antemortem inspection) and the carcass and parts after slaughter (postmortem inspection). In processing plants (as opposed to slaughter plants), inspectors need not be present at all times, but instead visit at least once a day. Such inspection also is considered to be continuous.
