= Poultry Products Inspection Act of 1957 =

- Long title: An Act to provide for the compulsory inspection by the United States Department of Agriculture of poultry and poultry products.
- Acronyms (colloquial): PPIA
- Nicknames: Poultry and Poultry Products Inspection Act
- Enacted by: the 85th United States Congress
- Effective: August 28, 1957

Citations
- Public law: 85-172
- Statutes at Large: 71 Stat. 441

Codification
- Titles amended: 21 U.S.C.: Food and Drugs
- U.S.C. sections created: 21 U.S.C. ch. 10 § 451 et seq.

Legislative history
- Introduced in the Senate as S. 1747 by Allen J. Ellender (D-LA) on March 27, 1957; Committee consideration by Senate Agriculture, Nutrition, and Forestry, House Agricultural; Passed the Senate on April 8, 1957 (Passed voice vote); Passed the House on July 15, 1957 (Passed voice vote); Reported by the joint conference committee on August 14, 1957; agreed to by the House on August 16, 1957 (Agreed voice vote) and by the Senate on August 19, 1957 (Agreed voice vote); Signed into law by President Dwight D. Eisenhower on August 28, 1957

The Poultry Products Inspection Act of 1957 (P.L. 85–172, as amended) requires the United States Department of Agriculture's Food Safety and Inspection Service (FSIS) to inspect all domesticated birds when slaughtered and processed into products for human consumption. By regulation, FSIS has defined domesticated birds as chickens, turkeys, ducks, geese, and guinea fowl. Ratites were added in 2001. The primary goals of the law are to prevent adulterated or misbranded poultry and products from being sold as food, and to ensure that poultry and poultry products are slaughtered and processed under sanitary conditions. These requirements also apply to products produced and sold within states as well as to imports, which must be inspected under equivalent foreign standards (21 U.S.C. 451 et seq.).

== Amendments to 1957 Act ==
U.S. Congressional amendments to the Poultry Products Inspection Act of 1957.

Date of Enactment	Public Law Number	U.S. Statute Citation	U.S. Legislative Bill	U.S. Presidential Administration
June 25, 1962	P.L. 87-498	76 Stat. 110	H.R. 7866	John F. Kennedy
August 18, 1968	P.L. 90-492	82 Stat. 791	H.R. 16363	Lyndon B. Johnson
June 30, 1982	P.L. 97-206	96 Stat. 136	H.R. 3863	Ronald W. Reagan
October 17, 1984	P.L. 98-487	98 Stat. 2264	H.R. 5223	Ronald W. Reagan

== See also ==
- Amenable species
- Federal Meat Inspection Act
