= Amenable species =

Amenable species is a term used within the context of USDA's meat and poultry inspection program to signify exotic species (livestock and fowl not covered by the statutes) that might be added to the laws and thus be eligible for mandatory federal inspection, which is taxpayer-funded. An exotic species is considered an amenable species if its anatomy and biology are substantially the same as the animals currently inspected. The Poultry Products Inspection Act (P.L. 85–172, as amended; 21 U.S.C. 451 et seq.) was expanded in 2001 to cover ostrich, rhea, and emu (ratites) because USDA determined that the hazards they present to food safety are essentially the same as those posed by chickens, turkeys, ducks, etc., and the existing contamination detection and prevention systems are sufficient to control them. Buffalo have been considered for inclusion under the Federal Meat Inspection Act (21 U.S.C. 601 et seq.) because they are bovine species (like cattle). Deer and elk, on the other hand, are cervids, and pose hazards for food safety that are not yet fully known or controlled for under the existing meat inspection system. The term non-amenable sometimes is used to describe cervids and certain other exotics, like rabbits, for example.
