= Food Safety and Inspection Service =

U.S. federal government agency

- Logo of the FSIS parent agency: The United States Department of Agriculture

Agency overview
- Formed: March 14, 1977; 49 years ago
- Preceding agency: Food Safety and Quality Service (FSQS)
- Jurisdiction: The United States of America
- Headquarters: Jamie L. Whitten Building 1400 Independence Ave SW Washington, D.C.
- Employees: 10,000
- Agency executives: Paul Kiecker, Acting Under Secretary of Agriculture for Food Safety; Terri Nintemann, Acting Administrator
- Parent agency: Department of Agriculture
- Website: www.fsis.usda.gov

The Food Safety and Inspection Service (FSIS), an agency of the United States Department of Agriculture (USDA), is the public health regulatory agency responsible for ensuring that United States' commercial supply of meat, poultry, and egg products is safe, wholesome, and correctly labeled and packaged. The FSIS draws its authority from the Federal Meat Inspection Act of 1906, the Poultry Products Inspection Act of 1957 and the Egg Products Inspection Act of 1970.

Food products under the jurisdiction of the FSIS, and thus subject to inspection, are those that contain more than 3% meat or 2% poultry products, with several exceptions, and egg products (liquid, frozen or dried). Shell eggs, meat and poultry products not under the jurisdiction of the FSIS are under the jurisdiction of the United States Food and Drug Administration (FDA). The FSIS is led by the under secretary of agriculture for food safety.

== Overview ==
More than 7,800 FSIS inspection program personnel are assigned to about 6,200 federal slaughter, food processing, and import establishments in the United States. They verify the processing of tens of billions of pounds of meat and poultry, and billions of pounds of egg products. At slaughter establishments, inspectors perform antemortem inspections to prevent slaughter of diseased animals. Then, postmortem examinations are performed to identify diseased carcasses not evident antemortem. Regulations for rapid chilling, adequate trimming, and sanitary washing are enforced to reduce microbial contamination. Samples are collected for residue testing to ensure antibiotic, pesticide and other residues are below regulatory limits. For cattle, tissue samples are tested for the presence of bovine spongiform encephalopathy. In processing plants, procedures and formulations are monitored to ensure that FSIS requirements and standards of identity are met. Inspectors in egg plants primarily monitor pasteurization. In all plants, sanitation, net weight, and accurate labeling (including nutrition information) regulations are enforced. FSIS also is responsible for products presented for import inspection at ports and borders, from countries that FSIS has determined to have inspection systems equivalent to Federal inspection systems.

Everyone in the food chain, from farmer through consumer, has a responsibility in keeping the food supply safe. Meat, poultry, and processed egg products can be contaminated with bacteria at any point during production, distribution, and consumption. FDA works closely with other federal agencies that have some role in the regulation of meat, poultry, and processed egg products along the farm-to-table continuum.

FSIS is a large, independent agency that functions separately from the FDA and participates in business oversight. FSIS is under the direction of the Department of Agriculture while the FDA is under the direction of the Department of Health and Human Services. The two agencies share responsibilities on various topics concerning food safety, but have different methods of enforcement and supervision of food producers. For example, both FSIS and the FDA have the authority to regulate food labeling. In March 2014, FSIS implemented a new regulatory requirement for labeling; 9 CFR Part 412. At times, FSIS requires a food producer to obtain pre-market approval of their intended label before the product is entered into the stream of commerce (for products under their jurisdiction. If product is covered by a standard of identity and meets the established standard, then pre-market approval is not necessary. The FDA does not require that a food producer, in their jurisdiction, obtain pre-market approval of their label. FSIS takes a preemptive role in food labeling where the FDA takes a reactive role in food labeling. The FSIS also has authority in inspection and monitoring of food-related establishments, while the FDA has no jurisdiction regarding restaurants and food businesses.

FSIS derives its authority from the Federal Meat Inspection Act of 1906, the Poultry Products Inspection Act of 1957, and the Egg Products Inspection Act of 1970. FSIS inspects meat and poultry products to ensure that there is no misbranded or adulterated products being put into the stream of commerce.

FSIS accepts written requests to amend, issue, or repeal regulations that it administers.

== Recalls ==
Recalls are voluntary actions by manufacturers, distributors or importers to protect the public by removing from commerce products that are adulterated or misbranded. The majority of recalls in recent years have been due to undeclared allergens on product labels.

As soon as FSIS learns that a meat or poultry product under its jurisdiction may be unsafe or mislabeled is in commerce, the agency forms a team to determine whether a recall is needed. The Recall Committee is composed of FSIS representatives from various areas of expertise. The committee evaluates all the information available and makes a recommendation to the establishment whose product is in question, including the parameters of the recall.

After a recall is issued, FSIS conducts effectiveness checks to ensure that the company’s customers (or consignees) have received notice of the recall and are making every effort to retrieve and destroy the recalled product or return it to the recalling firm. FSIS personnel verify that the recalling firm has been diligent and successful in notifying and advising their consignees of the need to retrieve and control recalled product, and that the consignees have responded accordingly. FSIS has formal agreements with many state governments that allow those states to participate in effectiveness checks, thus improving the speed and effectiveness of recalls.

When a product is recalled, FSIS issues a recall release to the media in the affected area, sends it to public health partners and stakeholders and posts it on the FSIS Web site.

In certain situations where a recall is not warranted, but there is still a risk to public health, FSIS may issue a public health alert. PHAs have been issued when a product was not considered adulterated, but illnesses were involved; when illnesses were associated with a meat or poultry product, but a source of contamination was not identified; or a product is no longer available in commerce, but may be held or in use by consumers.

The FSIS also acts as an investigation organization involved in food-related businesses if suspicions regarding consumer safety or criminal abuse arise. During an investigation, the FSIS will dispatch an investigator that will attempt to detect any criminal or violations regarding the USDA regulations. If evidence of consumer abuse or infractions regarding the USDA health regulations, the FSIS will close the business until the establishment has restored itself to the acceptable level for any USDA approved business. If major criminal activity or heavy violation of the USDA regulations is found, the FSIS has the authority to shut down the business to protect consumer safety and public health. In extreme cases, where egregious acts of disregard for the regulatory requirements has been extensively identified and documented, establishment owners and operators have been tried, convicted and jailed for their actions or lack thereof.

== History ==
The FSIS's parent organization, the U.S. Department of Agriculture was founded in 1862 by President Abraham Lincoln. Harvey W. Wiley, M.D, who was appointed to the position of chief chemist at the USDA in 1883 devoted his career to the struggle against foodborne illnesses, by among other things campaigning for the Pure Food and Drug Act. It would however take effect until 1905, the technologically enabled rapid growth of the meat industry and the publication of The Jungle, which detailed the meat industry and its working conditions, for the act to pass. The Pure Food and Drug Act’s main purpose lay in the banning of foreign and interstate traffic of adulterated and mislabelled food and its direction of the U.S. Bureau of Chemistry to inspect food products and refer offenders to the prosecution. It also constituted a major step towards the creation of the Food and Drug Administration. The Federal Meat Inspection Act (FMIA), which prohibited the sale of adulterated or misbranded meat and meat products and laid out that the slaughter of animals with the purpose of meat produce had to take place under certain sanitary conditions, was passed on the same day.

The USDA's Bureau of Chemistry and its Bureau of Animal Industry (BAI) were assigned the tasks of enforcing the Pure Food and Drug Act and the FMIA, respectively. This meant that the BAI performed meat inspection services. The USDA’s Bureau of Chemistry, would later be reorganized and renamed Food and Drug Administration (FDA), which now belongs to the Department of Health and Human Services. In the post-World War 2 period, the invention and commercialization of the refrigerator led to a modernization of the meat industry. The Agricultural Marketing Act of 1946 expanded the scope of USDA-inspections by allowing for the inspections of exotic and game animals as well as the inspection and certification of agricultural products.

As the consumer demands for poultry products grew in the post-World War 2 period, the Poultry Products Inspection Act was passed, ensuring, just like the FMIA did for meat products, that poultry products shipped in interstate commerce would be continuously inspected. Subsequent to continuous amendments to the existing regulations in the 1950s and 1960s, which tried to deal with concerns about the rising complexity in meat production, chemical contaminations and animal welfare, federal meat and poultry inspections were merged into one program.

With the passing of the Egg Products Inspections Act of 1970, the inspections of eggs and egg products was added to the USDA’s responsibilities. Today the FSIS is responsible for the inspection of pasteurized liquid, frozen, or dried egg products, while the FDA undertakes to ensure shell egg safety. Following the reorganization of the USDA’s agricultural research service, the Food Safety and Quality Service was created in 1977 to assume responsibility of meat and poultry grading as well as inspections. Only four years later it was reorganized and renamed to the Food Safety and Inspection Service (FSIS) under which the agency is still known today. The FSIS would undergo a major chance in philosophy, following a major outbreak of E. coli in 1993: It changed from relying largely on organoleptic (sight, touch & smell) controls to a more scientific approach with a focus on the prevention and reduction of microbial pathogens on raw products that can cause illness. Underlining this decision, the FHIS issued the Hazard analysis and critical control points (HACCP) rule, which details a systematic approach to food safety from biological, chemical and physical hazards. It also illustrates the role of public and private sector with regards to food safety: While the industry is accountable for producing safe food, the government is responsible for setting appropriate food safety standards, maintaining vigorous inspection oversight, and maintaining a strong regulatory enforcement program to deal with noncompliance.

In more recent times, the FSIS built on the foundation of HACCP by intensifying efforts to combat food-borne pathogens, by for example testing for Listeria monocytogenes tightening the restriction combating Salmonella.

During the coronavirus (COVID-19) pandemic, 145 field employees tested positive for COVID-19, and three died. One of the three FSIS inspectors based in New York City visited plants while potentially infected, and later died. This was despite the FDA postponing most foreign facility inspections and all domestic routine surveillance facility inspections on March 18.

== See also ==
- Title 9 of the Code of Federal Regulations
- Food and Drug Administration (FDA)
- Centers for Disease Control and Prevention (CDC)
- Continuous inspection
- U.S. Environmental Protection Agency (EPA)
- Animal and Plant Health Inspection Service (APHIS)
- Cooperative State Research, Education, and Extension Service (CSREES)
- Food and Nutrition Service (FNS)
- National Agricultural Library (NAL)
