= Medieval household =

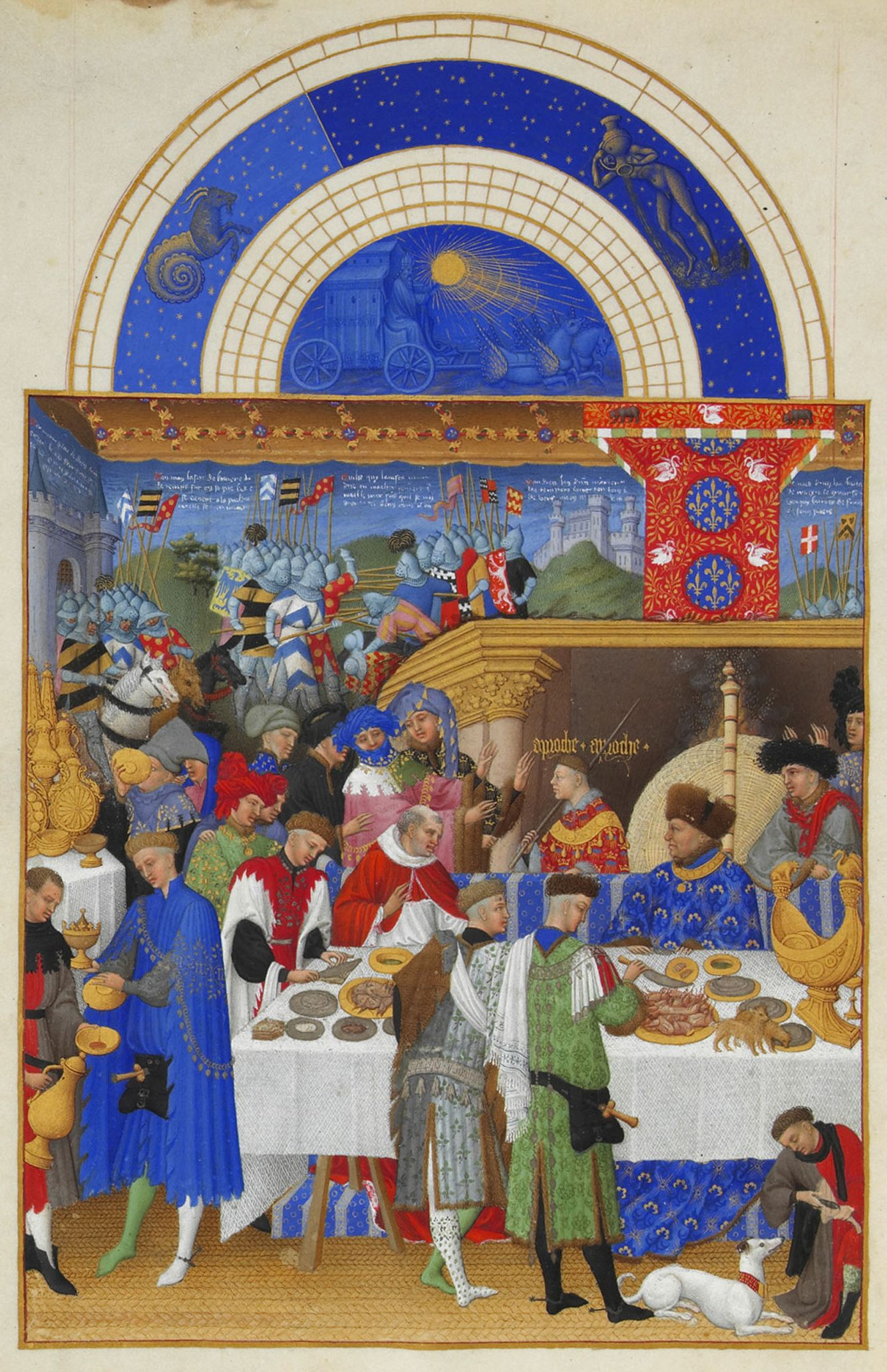
John, Duke of Berry enjoying a grand meal. The Duke is seen sitting at the high table surrounded by numerous servants, guests and dependants. Illustration from Très Riches Heures du Duc de Berry, ca 1410.

The medieval household was, like modern households, the center of family life for all classes of European society. Yet in contrast to the household of today, it consisted of many more individuals than the nuclear family. From the household of the king to the humblest peasant dwelling, more or less distant relatives and varying numbers of servants and dependents would cohabit with the master of the house and his immediate family. The structure of the medieval household was largely dissolved by the advent of privacy in early modern Europe.

Variations were immense over an entire continent and a time span of about 1,000 years. However, it is still possible to speak of a classical model of the medieval household, particularly as it evolved in Carolingian France and from there spread over great parts of Europe.

== Historical background ==
Neither Greek nor Latin had a word corresponding to modern-day "family". The Latin familia must be translated to "household" rather than "family". The aristocratic household of ancient Rome was similar to that of medieval Europe, in that it consisted – in addition to the paterfamilias, his wife and children – of a number of clients (cliens), or dependents of the lord who would attend upon him, counsel him and receive rewards. Where it differed from its medieval equivalent was in the use of slaves rather than paid servants for the performance of menial tasks. Another difference was that, due to the relative security and peacefulness within the borders of the Roman Empire, there was little need for fortification. The aristocratic household of medieval Europe, on the other hand, was as much a military as a socio-economic unit, and from the 9th century onwards the ideal residence was the castle.

== Composition ==
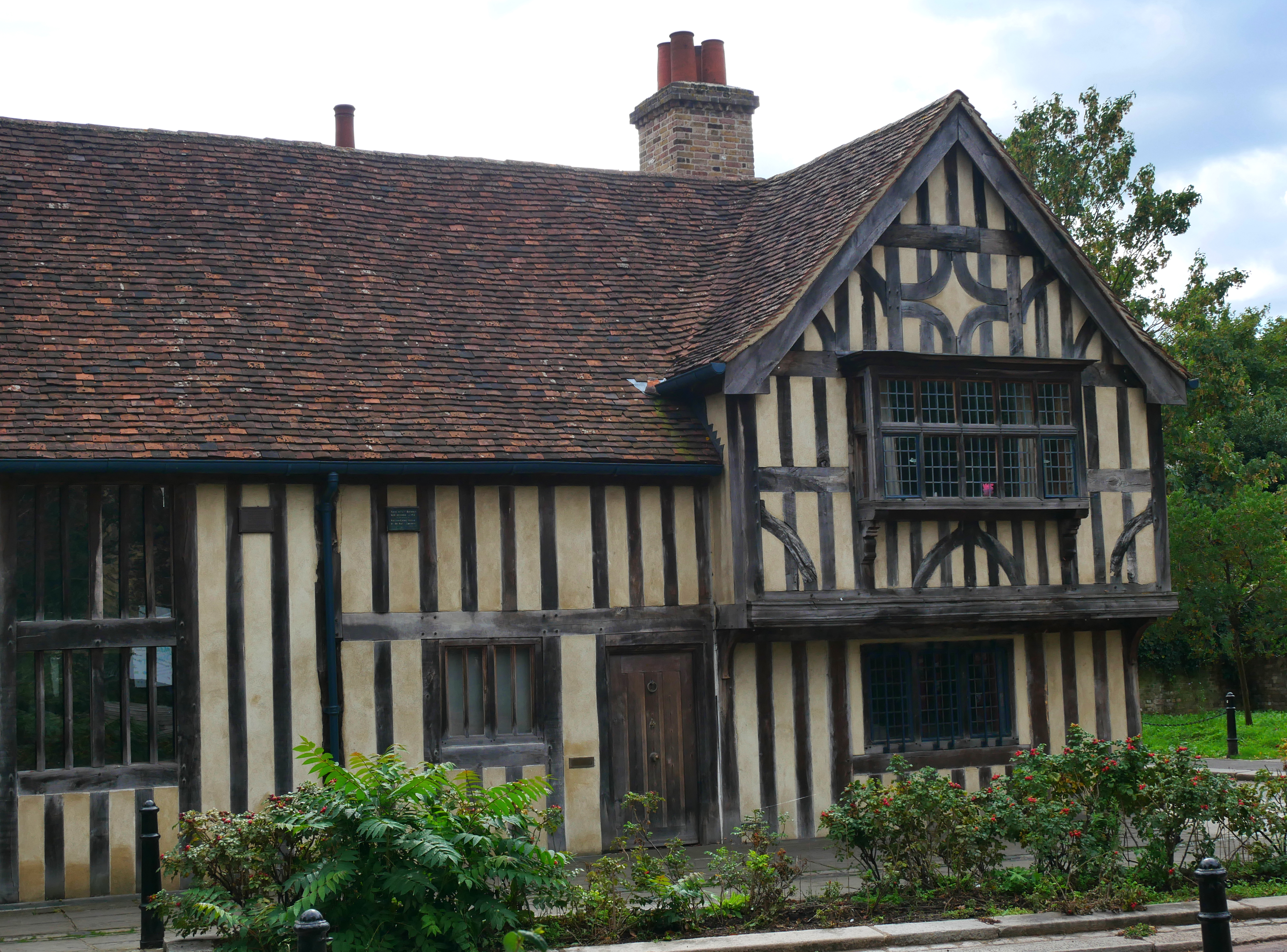
The Ancient House, Walthamstow,1435

As a result of the military nature of the medieval noble household, its composition was predominately male. Towards the end of the medieval period, the ratio leveled out somewhat. However, at an earlier date, the feminine element of the household consisted only of the lady and her daughters, their attendants, and perhaps a few domestics to perform particular tasks such as washing. Many of the male servants were purely military personnel; there would be a gatekeeper, as well as various numbers of knights and esquires to garrison the castle as a military unit. Yet many of these would also serve other functions, and there would be servants entirely devoted to domestic tasks. At the lower level, these were simply local men recruited from the localities. The higher level positions – in particular those attending on the lord – were often filled by men of rank: sons of the lord's relatives, or his retainers.

The presence of servants of noble birth imposed a social hierarchy on the household that went parallel to the hierarchy dictated by function. This second hierarchy had at its top the steward (alternatively seneschal or majordomo), who had the overriding responsibility for the domestic affairs of the household. Taking care of the personal wellbeing of the lord and his family were the Chamberlain, who was responsible for the chamber or private living-quarters, and the Master of the Wardrobe, who had the main responsibility for clothing and other domestic items.

Of roughly equal authority to the steward was the marshal. This officer had the militarily vital responsibility for the stables and horses of the household (the "marshalsea"), and was also in charge of discipline. The marshal, and other higher-ranking servants, would have assistants helping them perform their tasks. These – called valets de chambre, grooms or pages, ranking from top to bottom in that order – were most often young boys; however, in the larger royal courts, the valet de chambres included both young noble courtiers, and often artists, musicians and other specialists who might be of international repute. Assigning these the office of valet was a way of regularising their position within the household.

One of the most important functions of the medieval household was the procurement, storage and preparation of food. This involved both feeding the occupants of the residence on a daily basis, and preparing larger feasts for guests, to maintain the status of the lord. The kitchen was divided into a pantry for bread, cheese and napery, and a buttery for wine, ale and beer. These offices were headed by a pantler and a butler respectively. Depending on the size and wealth of the household, these offices would then be subdivided further. The following is a list of some of the offices one could expect to find in a large medieval aristocratic or royal household:

Household offices:
Administration	Food and Drink (main)	Food and Drink (secondary)	Other
Household (Steward); Marshalsea; Chamber; Wardrobe	Kitchen; Pantry; Buttery	Confectionery; Cellar; Poultry; Spicery; Larder; Scalding-house; Saucery; Ancillae; Handmaiden	Scullery; Chandlery; Ewery; Laundry; Napery

In addition to these offices, there was a need for servants to take care of the hunting animals. The master huntsman, or the veneur, held a central position in greater noble households. Likewise, the master falconer was a high-ranking officer, often of noble birth himself. There were spiritual needs to be cared for, and a chapel was a natural part of every large household. These household chapels would be staffed by varying numbers of clerics. The chaplains, confessors and almoners could serve in administrative capacities as well as the religious ones.

== Noble households ==
The households of medieval kings were in many ways simply aristocratic households on a larger scale: as the Burgundian court chronicler Georges Chastellain observed of the splendidly ordered court of the dukes of Burgundy, "after the deeds and exploits of war, which are claims to glory, the household is the first thing that strikes the eye, and which it is, therefore, most necessary to conduct and arrange well." In some ways though, they were essentially different. One major difference was the way in which royal household officials were largely responsible for the governance of the realm, as well as the administration of the household.

The 11th century Capetian kings of France, for instance, "ruled through royal officers who were in many respects indistinguishable from their household officers." These officers – primarily the seneschal, constable, butler, chamberlain and chancellor – would naturally gain extensive powers, and could exploit this power for social advancement. One example of this is the Carolingians of France, who rose from the position of royal stewards – the Mayors of the Palace – to become kings in their own right. It was the father of Charlemagne, Pepin the Short, who gained control of government from the enfeebled Merovingian king Childeric III.^{[a]} Another example can be found in the royal House of Stuart in Scotland, whose family name bore witness to their background of service.

Eventually, the central positions of the royal household became little else than honorary titles bestowed upon the greatest families, and not necessarily even dependent on attendance at court. In Flanders, by the thirteenth century, the offices of constable, butler, steward and chamberlain had become the hereditary right of certain high noble families, and held no political significance.

Finally, the royal household differed from most noble households in the size of their military element. If a king was able to muster a substantial force of household knights, this would reduce his dependence on the military service of his subjects. This was the case with Richard II of England, whose one-sided dependence on his household knights – mostly recruited from the county of Cheshire – made him unpopular with his nobility and eventually contributed to his downfall.

In England, the semi-royal household of Edward of Carnarvon, later Edward II when Prince of Wales, is the earliest for which detailed knowledge can be obtained from sources.

== Itineration ==
The medieval aristocratic household was not fixed to one location, but could be more or less permanently on the move. Greater nobles would have estates scattered over large geographical areas, and to maintain proper control of all their possessions it was important to physically inspect the localities on a regular basis. As the master of the horses, travel was the responsibility of the marshal. Everything in the noble household was designed for travel, so that the lord could enjoy the same luxury wherever he went.

Particularly for kings, itineration was a vital part of governance, and in many cases kings would rely on the hospitality of their subjects for maintenance while on the road. This could be a costly affair for the localities visited; there was not only the large royal household to cater for, but also the entire royal administration. It was only towards the end of the medieval period, when means of communication improved, that households, both noble and royal, became more permanently attached to one residence.

== Regional variations ==
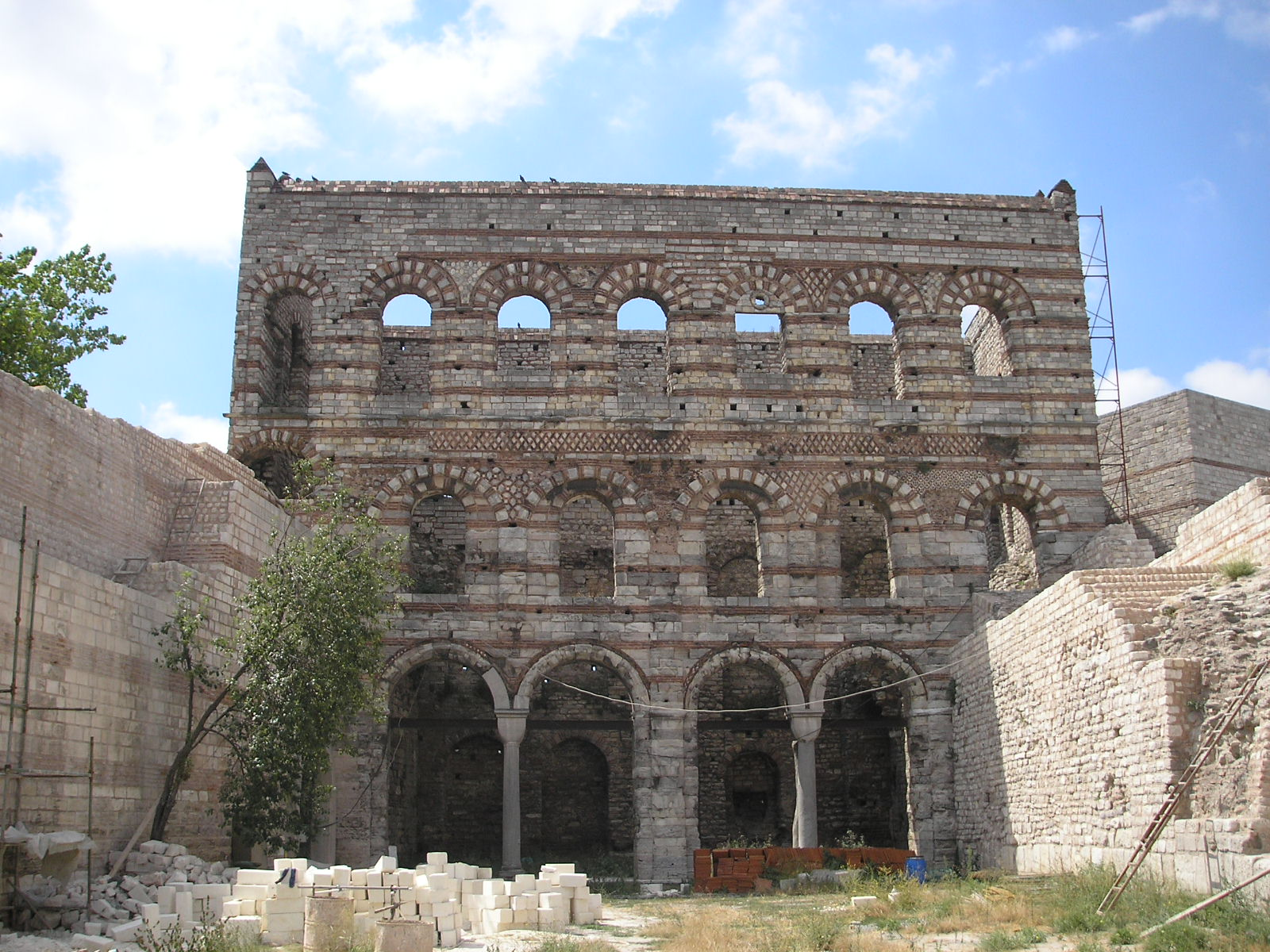
The ruins of the Byzantine Palace of the Porphyrogenitus in Istanbul.

The aristocratic society centered on the castle originated, as much of medieval culture in general, in Carolingian France, and from there spread over most of Western Europe. In other parts of Europe, the situation was different. On the northern and western fringes of the continent, society was kin-based rather than feudal, and households were organised correspondingly.

In Ireland, the basis for social organisation was the "sept", a clan that could comprise as many as 250 households, or 1250 individuals, all somehow related. In Viking-age Scandinavia, housing arrangements were more humble than those of contemporary France or England, but also here the greater lords would own grand halls wherein they might entertain large numbers of guests.

In the Byzantine Empire, slaves were employed until the end of the Empire, as were eunuchs. Little is known of the living arrangements of the Byzantines, as very few buildings remain. From historical and architectural evidence, it is known that, even though castles were rare, the wealthy lived in palaces of varying magnitude, with chapels and gardens, and rich decorations of mosaics and frescoes.

== Common households ==
=== Rural ===
The households of medieval peasant families were naturally smaller than those of the aristocracy, and as such resembled modern households more. The patterns of marriage fluctuated greatly over the course of the Middle Ages. Even though most of the available evidence concerns the higher classes, and the source material for southern Europe is richer than for the rest, it is still possible to make some rough generalisations. It seems clear that the average age of marriage during the Early Middle Ages was comparatively high, in the early twenties, and quite equal for men and women. The reason for this can be found in traditions brought forward from the Germanic tribes, but equally in the fact that habitation was confined to small areas, a factor that enforced restrictions on population growth.

As more land was won for cultivation, this trend changed. During the High and Late Middle Ages, women were increasingly married away in their teens, leading to higher birth rates. While women would be married once they reached reproductive age, men had to possess independent means of sustenance – to be able to provide for a family – before entering into marriage. For this reason, the average age of marriage for men remained high, in the mid- to late twenties.

Even though peasant households were significantly smaller than aristocratic ones, the wealthiest of these would also employ servants. Service was a natural part of the cycle of life, and it was common for young people to spend some years away from home in the service of another household. This way they would learn the skills needed later in life, and at the same time earn a wage. This was particularly useful for girls, who could put the earnings towards their dowry.

The houses of medieval peasants were of poor quality compared to modern houses. The floor was normally of earth, and there was very little ventilation or sources of light in the form of windows. In addition to the human inhabitants, a number of livestock animals would also reside in the house. Towards the end of the medieval period, however, conditions generally improved. Peasant houses became larger in size, and it became more common to have two rooms, and even a second floor.

=== Urban ===
The medieval world was a much less urban society than either the Roman Empire or the modern world. The fall of the Roman Empire in the fifth century had caused a catastrophic de-population of the towns and cities that had existed within the Empire. Between the 10th and 12th centuries, however, a revival of the European city occurred, with an increase in the urbanisation of society.

The practice of sending children away to act as servants was even more common in towns than in the countryside. The inhabitants of towns largely made their livelihood as merchants or artisans, and this activity was strictly controlled by guilds. The members of these guilds would in turn employ young people – primarily boys – as apprentices, to learn the craft and later take a position as guild members themselves.^{[b]} These apprentices made up part of the household – or "family" – as much as the children of the master.

== Later perspectives ==
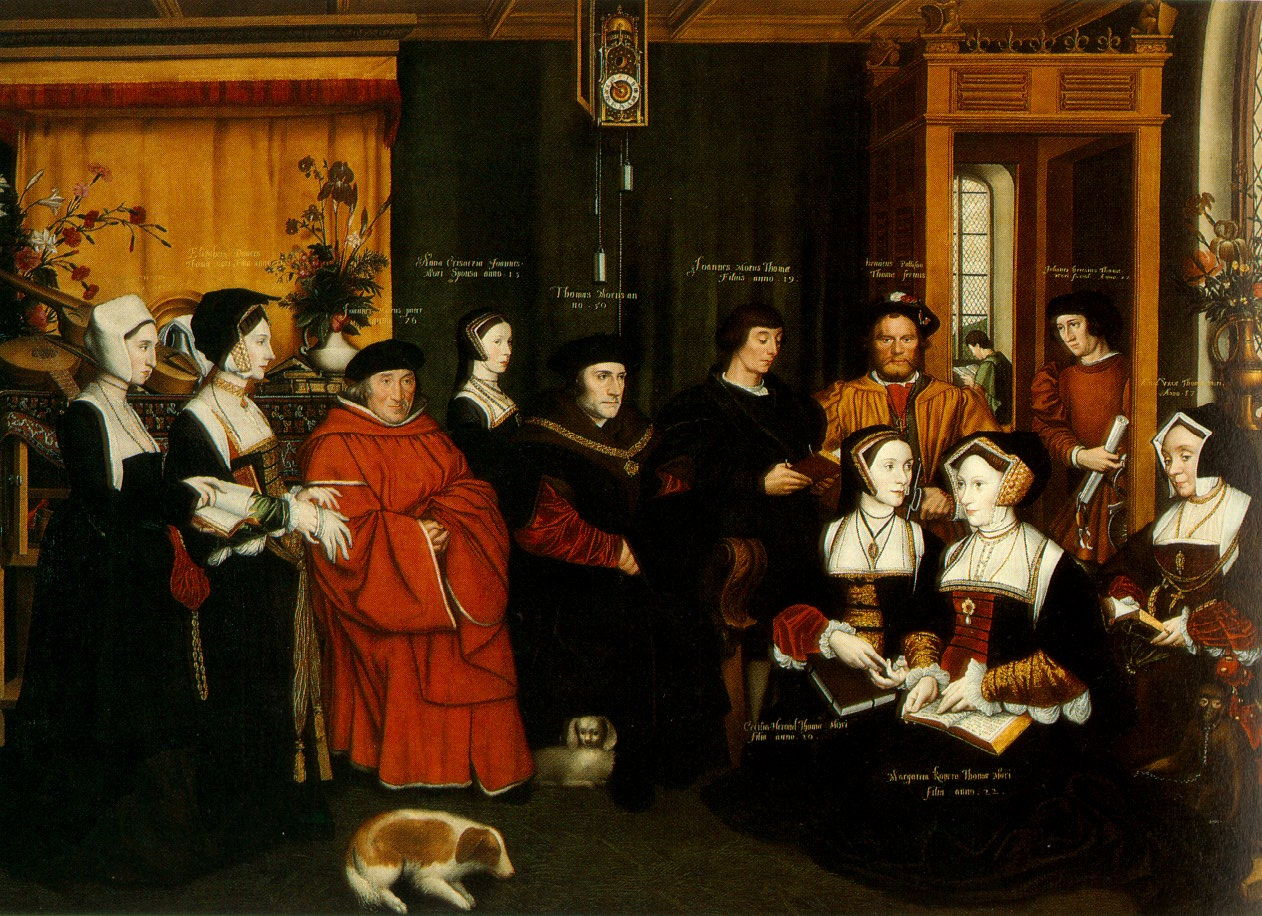
Thomas More with his immediate family – painted by Holbein – presenting an ideal image of the early modern family man

Towards the end of the Middle Ages, the functions and composition of households started to change. This was due primarily to two factors. First of all, the introduction of gunpowder to the field of warfare rendered the castle a less effective defence, and did away with the military function of the household. The result was a household more focused on comfort and luxury, and with a significantly larger proportion of women.

The second factor that brought about change was the early modern ascendancy of the individual, and focus on privacy.^{[c]} Already in the later Middle Ages castles had begun to incorporate an increasing number of private chambers, for the use both of the lord and of his servants. Once the castle was discarded to the benefit of palaces or stately homes, this tendency was reinforced. This did not mean an end to the employment of domestic servants, or even in all cases a reduction in household staff. What it did mean, however, was a realignment whereby the family – in a genealogical sense – became the cornerstone of the household.

== See also ==
- Royal Household
- Medieval cuisine
- Medieval demography
- Medieval fortification
- Medieval gardening
- Medieval hunting

== Notes ==
a. The chronicler Einhard sardonically wrote: "Pepin the Short, the father of Charlemagne, held the office for some years, under, if that is the word, King Childeric III..."

b. It should be mentioned that many – if not most – of these apprentices never achieved guild membership for themselves, but ended up spending their whole life as wage laborers.

c. The idea of the invention of the individual in Renaissance Italy is primarily associated with Jacob Burckhardt. In spite of later criticism, this thesis is still highly influential.

== Sources ==
- Abulafia, David, ed. (1999). The New Cambridge Medieval History, Volume V c.1198-c.1300. Cambridge: Cambridge University Press. ISBN 0-521-36289-X.
- Allmand, Christopher, ed. (1998). The New Cambridge Medieval History, Volume VII c.1415-c.1500. Cambridge: Cambridge University Press. p. 324. ISBN 0-521-38296-3.
- Ariès, Phillippe; Duby, Georges; Goldhammer, Arthur (2003). A History of Private Life, Volume II, Revelations of the Medieval World. Belknap Press. ISBN 0-674-40001-1.
- Burckhardt, Jacob (1990). The civilization of the Renaissance in Italy. London: Penguin books. ISBN 0-14-044534-X.* Cantor, Norman F. (1994). The Civilization of the Middle Ages. New York: Harper Perennial. ISBN 0-06-017033-6.
- Cipolla, Carlo M. (1993). Before the Industrial Revolution: European Society and Economy, 1000-1700 (3rd ed.). London, New York: Routledge. ISBN 0-415-09005-9.
- Contamine, Philippe (1984). War in the Middle Ages. Oxford: Blackwell. ISBN 0-631-13142-6.
- Cummins, John (2001). The Hound and the Hawk: The Art of Medieval Hunting. London: Phoenix. ISBN 1-84212-097-2.
- Daniell, Christopher (2003). From Norman Conquest to Magna Carta: England, 1066-1215. London: Routledge. ISBN 0-415-22215-X.
- Davies, R.R. (2000). The First English Empire: Power and Identities in the British Isles 1093-1343. Oxford: Oxford University Press. ISBN 0-19-820849-9.
- Duncan, Archibald A. M. (1993). "The 'Laws of Malcolm MacKenneth'". In Grant, Alexander; Stringer, Keith J. (eds.). Medieval Scotland: Crown, Lordship and Community: Essays Presented to G.W.S. Barrow. Edinburgh: Edinburgh University Press. ISBN 0-7486-0418-9.
- Gies, Joseph; Gies, Frances (1979). Life in a Medieval Castle (3rd ed.). New York, Toronto: Harper Perennial. ISBN 0-06-090674-X.
- Hanawalt, Barbara (1988). The Ties That Bound: Peasant Families in Medieval England. Oxford: Oxford University Press.
- Herlihy, David (1985). Medieval Households. Cambridge, Massachusetts; London: Harvard University Press. ISBN 0-674-56375-1.
- Hollister, C. Warren (2001). Medieval Europe: A Short History (9th ed.). Boston, London: McGraw-Hill. ISBN 0-07-112109-9.
- Horrox, Rosemary; Ormrod, W. Mark (2006). A Social History of England, 1200-1500. Cambridge: Cambridge University Press. ISBN 978-0-521-78954-7.
- Huizinga, Johan (1924). The Waning of the Middle Ages.
- Hussey, Joan Mervyn (1982). The Byzantine World (reprint ed.). Greenwood Press. ISBN 0-313-23148-6.
- Lewis, Thorpe, ed. (1969). Two Lives of Charlemagne (new ed.). London: Penguin Classics. ISBN 0-14-044213-8.
- Luscombe, David; Riley-Smith, Jonathan, eds. (2004). The New Cambridge Medieval History, Volume IV c.1024-c.1198 (part 2). Cambridge: Cambridge University Press. ISBN 0-521-41411-3.
- McKisack, May (1959). The Fourteenth Century. Oxford History of England. Oxford: Oxford University Press.
- Morris, Marc (2003). Castle. London: Channel 4 Books. ISBN 0-7522-1536-1.
- Murray, Jacqueline, ed. (2001). Love, Marriage, and Family in the Middle Ages: A Reader. Peterborough, Ontario: Broadview. ISBN 1-55111-104-7.
- Reuter, Timothy, ed. (2000). The New Cambridge Medieval History, Volume III c.900-c.1024. Cambridge: Cambridge University Press. ISBN 0-521-36447-7.
- Roesdahl, Else (1998). The Vikings (2nd ed.). London: Penguin Books. ISBN 0-14-025282-7.
- Saul, Nigel (1999). Richard II. New Haven and London: Yale University Press. ISBN 0-300-07875-7.
- Veyne, Paul; Ariès, Phillippe; Duby, Georges; Goldhammer, Arthur (1992). A History of Private Life, Volume I, From Pagan Rome to Byzantium. Belknap Press. ISBN 0-674-39974-9.
- Woolgar, C. M. (1999). The Great Household in Late Medieval England. New Haven and London: Yale University Press. ISBN 0-300-07687-8.
- Young, Bruce Wilson (2009). Family life in the Age of Shakespeare. Greenwood Press.
