= Great hall =

Largest room in a medieval manor

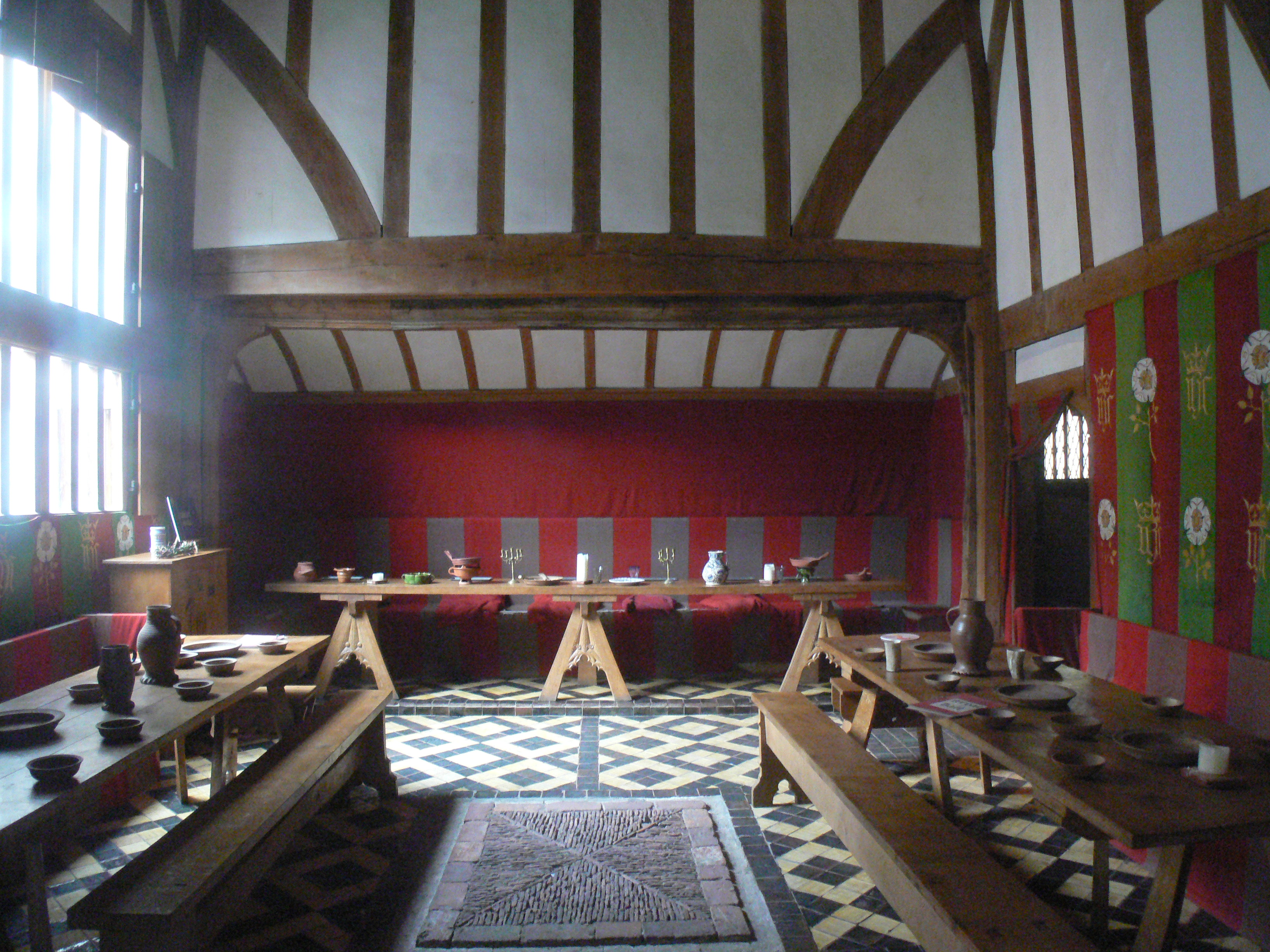
The Great Hall in Barley Hall, York, restored in the late 1980s to replicate its appearance in around 1483

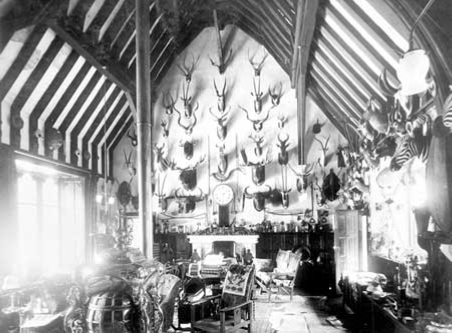
The great hall of The Abbey, Sutton Courtenay in 1906, filled with hunting trophies

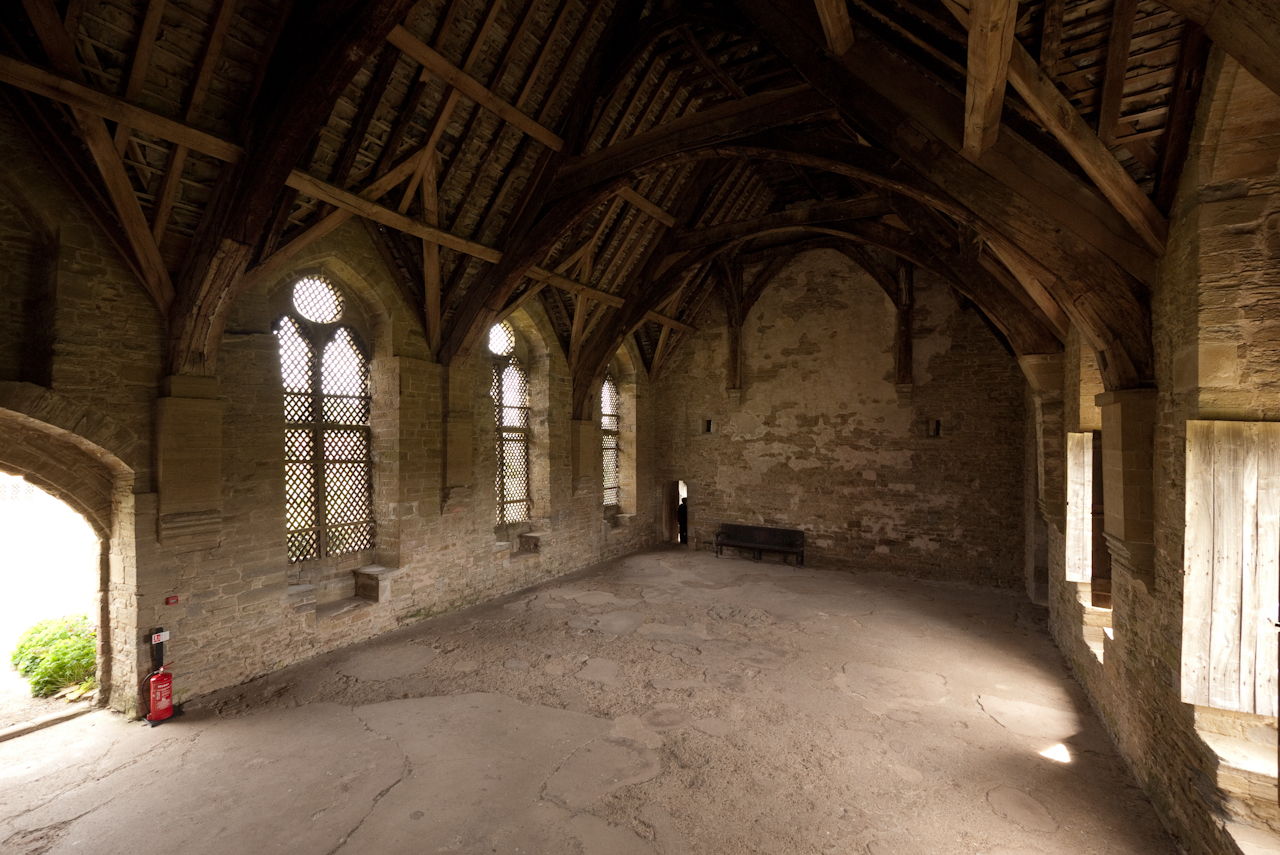
Great Hall at Stokesay Castle

A great hall is the main room of a royal palace, castle or a large manor house or hall house in the Middle Ages. It continued to be built in the country houses of the 16th and early 17th centuries, although by then the family used the great chamber for eating and relaxing. At that time the word "great" simply meant big and had not acquired its modern connotations of excellence. In the medieval period, the room would simply have been referred to as the "hall" unless the building also had a secondary hall. The term "great hall" has been mainly used for surviving rooms of this type for several centuries to distinguish them from the different type of hall found in post-medieval houses. Great halls were found especially in France, England and Scotland, but similar rooms were also found in some other European countries.

A typical great hall was a rectangular room between one and a half and three times as long as it was wide, and also higher than it was wide. It was entered through a screens passage at one end, and had windows on the long sides, often including a large bay window. There was usually a minstrels' gallery above the screens passage. The screens passage was divided from the hall by a timber screen with two openings. The portion of the screen between these openings could be movable, such as the one at Rufford Old Hall. At the other end of the hall was the dais where the high table was situated. The ceiling above the dais was often ornamented to denote its higher status. The lord's family's more private rooms lay beyond the dais end of the hall, and the kitchen, buttery and pantry were on the opposite side of the screens passage. The dais end is generally referred to as the 'upper' end, and the screens end as the 'lower' end.

Even royal and noble residences had few living rooms until late in the Middle Ages, and a great hall was a multifunctional room. It was used for receiving guests and it was the place where the household would dine together, including the lord of the house, his gentleman attendants and at least some of the servants. At night some members of the household might sleep on the floor of the great hall.

== Evolution ==
From the fall of the Roman Empire to the Renaissance, the hall was at the heart of residential complexes. Early examples were timber built and have vanished, only being known from documentary sources like Beowulf, and excavations. Archaeologists have uncovered Anglo-Saxon halls from the highest social levels at the palaces of Yeavering (Northumberland) and Cheddar (Somerset). The halls at both palaces were 120 feet (37m) long, that at Yeavering being seventh century and that at Cheddar (the first of several) being ninth century. Saxon halls were routinely aisled and occasionally had side walls that were bowed out in plan. At this point the hall was merely the largest of several detached structures, rather than being a room within a single building. From later Saxon times, the standard manorial plan began to emerge - the excavated tenth century hall at Sulgrave (Northamptonshire) has a definite 'high' end with an attached stone chamber wing and 'low' end with a cross-passage, services and detached kitchen. In the late tenth century, first floor stone halls began to be built in both France and England, partly for reasons of security. This form would become the basis for the hall keep. Examples can be seen at Langeais Castle (France), Richmond Castle (England) and Chepstow Castle (Wales), as well as on the Bayeux Tapestry. Many large ground floor aisled halls were built in England following the Norman Conquest, as the key room in the new feudal society. The greatest was that at Westminster Palace, built by William Rufus as a setting for secular royal events. Even ground floor halls were increasingly built of stone as the material became more widely available, though in thickly forested areas timber remained the material of choice. From the 13th century, improved carpentry techniques meant that roofs could span greater distances, eliminating the need for aisles, and by c.1300, the standard hall plan with the dais and great chamber at the upper end and the entrance, screens passage and services at the lower end had become commonplace. After this time, the function of the hall began to narrow to solely a dining and circulation space, and architectural developments reflected that, with the rise of the wall fireplace and bay window (also known as an oriel) creating a more pleasant and specialised chamber. It was formerly considered that the decline of the hall began with the decline of feudalism in the 14th century. More recent scholarship, however, is of the opinion that the great hall retained vitality into the sixteenth century, with many of the most impressive halls being later, like those of Eltham Palace (1475-80) and Hampton Court Palace (1532-35).

== Architectural detail ==
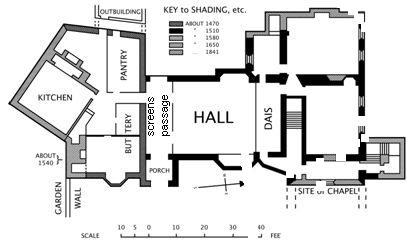
Plan of Horham Hall, including a screens passage, leading from the entrance porch; a dais; a bay window. The main staircase is at the dais end, and the hall was the full height of the two-storey house

The hall would originally have had a central hearth, with the smoke rising through a vent in the roof. Examples can be seen at Stokesay Castle and Ludlow Castle. Chimneys were later added, and it would then have one of the largest fireplaces of the palace, manor house or castle, frequently big enough to walk and stand inside. Where there was a wall fireplace, it was generally at the dais end of the hall with the bay window, as at Raglan Castle, so the lord could get the most heat and light. The hearth was used for heating and also for some of the cooking, although most houses had a dedicated kitchen for the bulk of the cooking. The fireplace would commonly have an elaborate overmantel with stone or wood carvings or plasterwork which might contain coats of arms, heraldic mottoes (usually in Latin), caryatids or another adornment. In the upper halls of French manor houses, the fireplaces were usually very large and elaborate.

The great hall typically had the finest decorations, as well as on the window frame mouldings of the outer wall. Many French manor houses have very beautifully decorated external window frames on the large mullioned windows that light the hall. This decoration clearly marked the window as belonging to the lord's private hall. It was where guests slept.

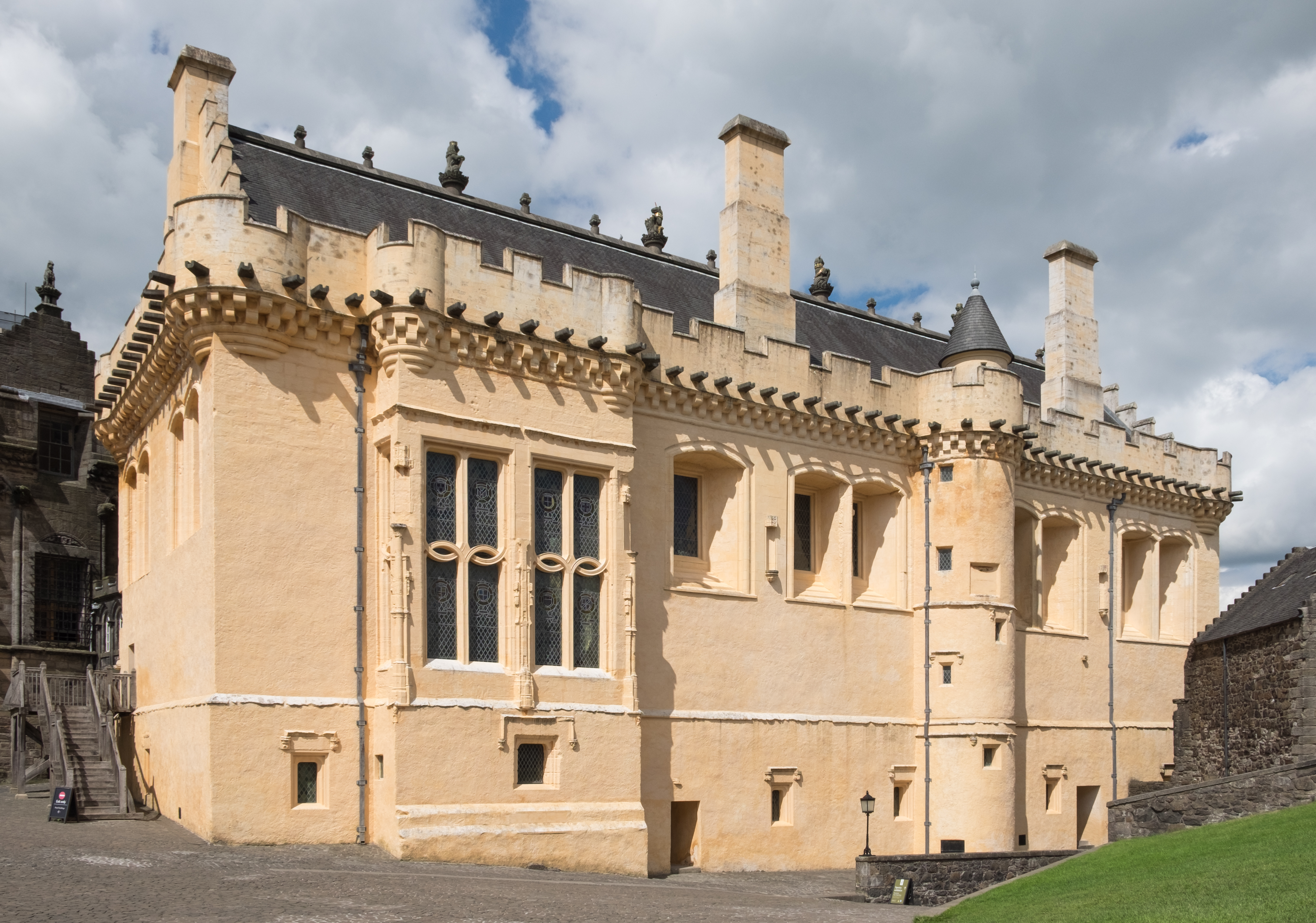
The Great Hall at Stirling Castle built for James IV. The larger windows lit the high table

In western France, the early manor houses were centred on a ground-floor hall. Later, the hall reserved for the lord and his high-ranking guests was moved up to the first-floor level. This was called the salle haute or upper hall (or "high room"). In some of the larger three-storey manor houses, the upper hall was as high as the second storey roof. The smaller ground-floor hall or salle basse remained, but was for receiving guests of any social order. It is very common to find these two halls superimposed, one on top of the other, in larger manor houses in Normandy and Brittany. Access from the ground-floor hall to the upper (great) hall was normally via an external staircase tower. The upper hall often contained the lord's bedroom and living quarters off one end.

In Scotland, six common furnishings were present in the sixteenth-century hall: the high table and principal seat; side tables for others; the cupboard and silver plate; the hanging chandelier, often called the 'hart-horn' made of antler; ornamental weapons, commonly a halberd; and the cloth and napery used for dining.

Occasionally the great hall would have an early listening device system, allowing conversations to be heard in the lord's bedroom above. In Scotland, these devices are called a laird's lug. In many French manor houses, there are small peepholes from which the lord could observe what was happening in the hall. This type of hidden peephole is called a judas in French. In England, such an opening is referred to as a squint and there are two connecting the hall and great chamber in Stokesay Castle.

== Examples ==
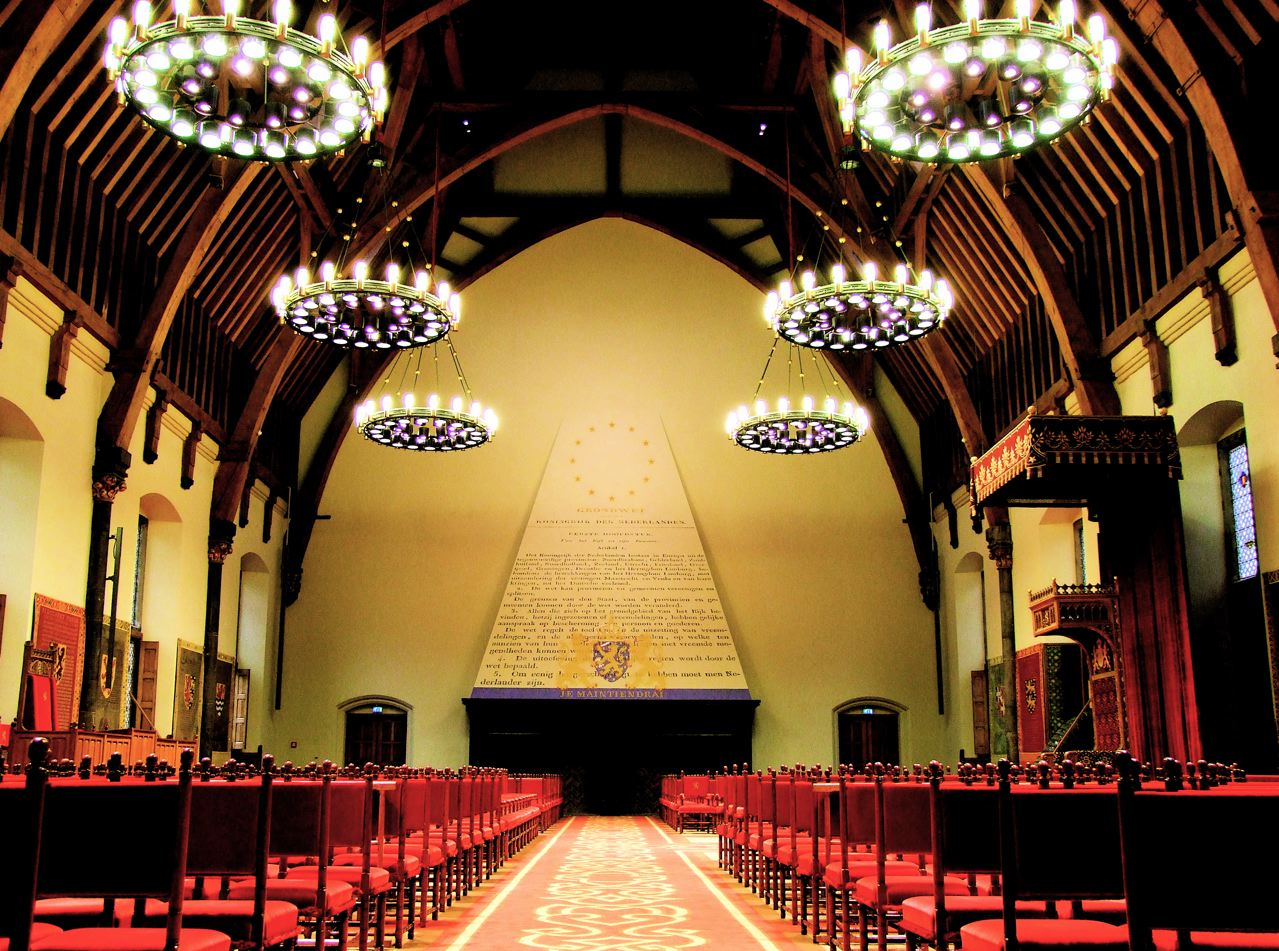
The Ridderzaal in The Hague is the main building of the 13th-century inner square of the former castle of the counts of Holland called Binnenhof

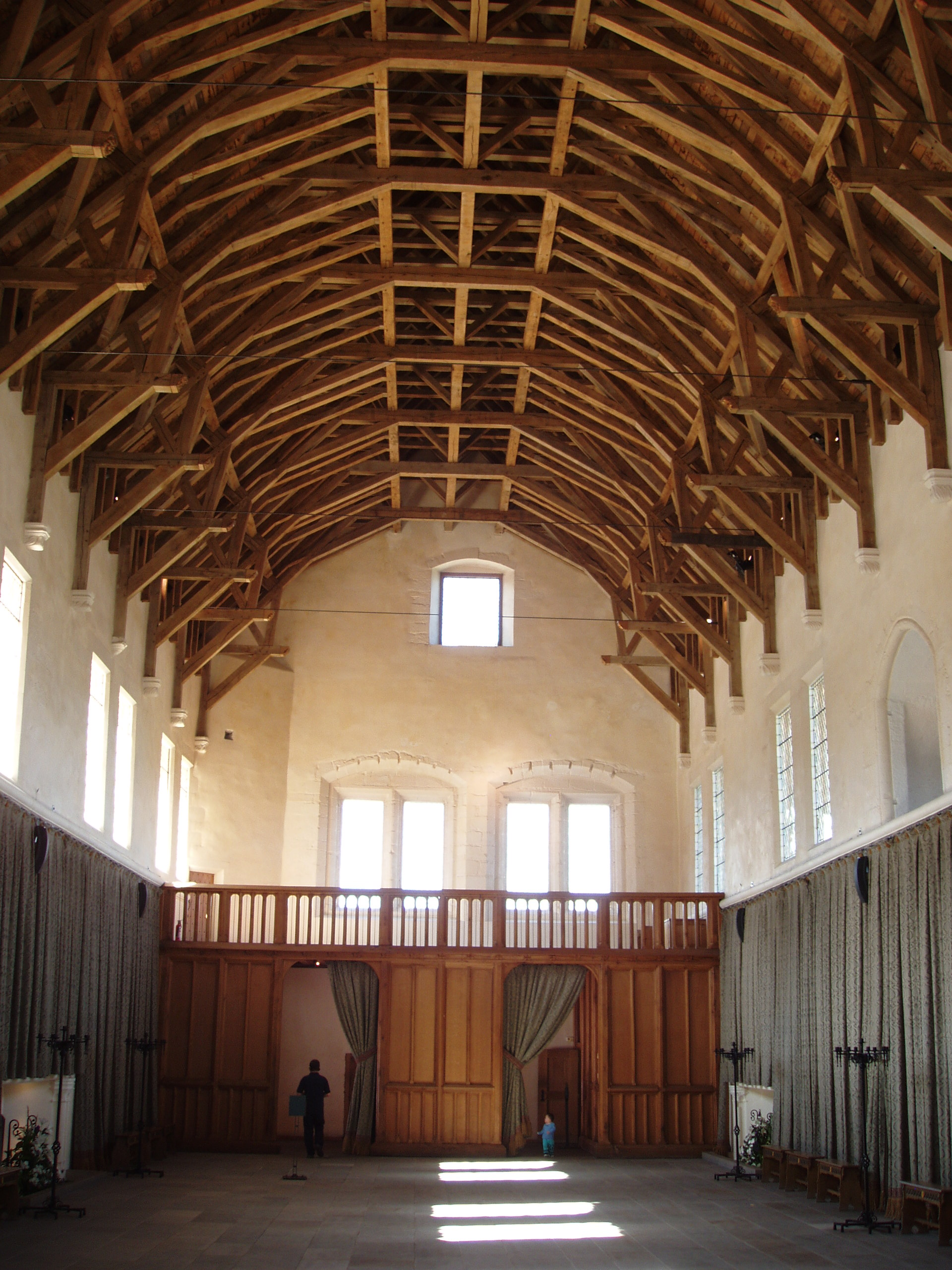
Great Hall of Stirling Castle, Scotland, view towards the north showing screens passage, with minstrels' gallery above

Many great halls still exist to this day. Three very large surviving royal halls are Westminster Hall, Ridderzaal in Binnenhof and the Vladislav Hall in Prague Castle (although the latter was used only for public events and never as a great hall). Penshurst Place in Kent, England, has a little-altered 14th century example, and Great Chalfield Manor has a similarly intact 15th century one. At the scale of yeoman housing, a restored 15th century hall can be seen in Bayleaf Farmhouse, now at the Weald and Downland Living Museum. Surviving 16th and early 17th century specimens in Britain are numerous, for example those at Eltham Palace (England), Longleat (England), Deene Park (England), Burghley House (England), Bodysgallen Hall (Wales), Darnaway Castle (Scotland), Muchalls Castle (Scotland) and Crathes Castle (Scotland). There are numerous ruined examples, notably at Linlithgow Palace (Scotland), Kenilworth Castle (England) and Raglan Castle (Wales).

== Survival ==
The domestic and monastic model applied to collegiate institutions during the Middle Ages. A few university colleges, including Merton College, Oxford (1277), Peterhouse, Cambridge (1290), University College, Durham (between 1284 and 1311, originally for the Prince Bishop of Durham), Trinity Hall, Cambridge (1350), and New College, Oxford (14th century), have medieval halls which are still used as dining rooms on a daily basis; many other colleges have later halls built in a similar medieval style, as do the Inns of Court and the Livery Companies in London. The "high table" (often on a small dais or stage at the top of the hall, furthest away from the screens passage) seats dons (at the universities) and Masters of the Bench (at the Inns of Court), whilst students (at the universities) and barristers or students (at the Inns of Court) dine at tables placed at right angles to the high table and running down the body of the hall, thus maintaining the hierarchical arrangement of the medieval domestic, monastic or collegiate household. Numerous more recently founded schools and institutions have halls and dining halls based on medieval great halls or monastic refectories.

== Decline and revival ==
From the 15th century onwards, halls lost most of their traditional functions to more specialised rooms, first for family members and guests to the great chamber and parlours, withdrawing rooms, and later for servants who finally achieved their own servants hall to eat in and servants’ bedrooms in attics or basements). By the late 16th century, the great hall was beginning to lose its purpose. While great halls became less important spaces at royal sites, at the homes of the nobility in the early Tudor period great halls retained their significance for longer even while great chambers were used.

Increasing centralization of power in royal hands meant that men of good social standing were less inclined to enter the service of a lord to obtain his protection, and so the size of the inner noble household shrank.

As the social gap between master and servant grew, the family retreated, usually to the first floor, to private rooms. In fact, servants were not normally allowed to use the same staircases as nobles to access the great hall of larger castles in early times, and servants' staircases are still extant in places such as Muchalls Castle. Other reception and living rooms in country houses became more numerous, specialised and important, and by the late 17th century, the halls of many new houses were simply vestibules, passed through to get to somewhere else, but not lived in. Several great halls like that at Great Hall in Lancashire were downsized to create two rooms. From the 16th century onwards, it was common to insert a floor into the smaller halls to create a lower entrance hall and a commodious first floor chamber.

The halls of late 17th, 18th and 19th-century country houses and palaces usually functioned almost entirely as impressive entrance points to the house, and for large scale entertaining, as at Christmas, for dancing, or when a touring company of actors performed. With the arrival of ballrooms and dedicated music rooms in the largest houses by the late 17th century, these functions too were lost. Where large halls survived, it was usually due to continuing institutional use, especially as a courtroom. This change of use preserved the halls of Winchester, Oakham and Leicester Castles. Other halls, like that at Eltham Palace, remained standing in a neglected state as barns. There was a revival of the great hall concept in the late 19th and early 20th centuries, with large halls used for banqueting and entertaining (but not as eating or sleeping places for servants) featuring in some houses of this period as part of a broader medieval revival, for example Thoresby Hall. Some medieval halls were also restored from neglect or ruin, like that at Mayfield Palace, which now serves Mayfield School.

== In popular culture ==
- In the Harry Potter franchise of books, films, and video games, the Great Hall within Hogwarts is the site of meals, feasts, assemblies, and awards ceremonies.
- Winchester Castle's Great Hall is an important site in British history; it was the location of the trial of Walter Raleigh and partially of the Bloody Assizes and it also contains a well-preserved imitative Arthurian Round Table.

== See also ==
- Banquet hall
- Dining hall
- Great room
- Hall and parlor house
- Manor house
- Mead hall
- Moot hall
- Refectory
- Tapestry
