= Ailesham cloth =

Fine linen cloth made in England during middle ages

Ailesham cloth was a fine linen cloth made in England during Middle Ages.

== History ==
Ailesham cloth is a cloth of ancient times. Exeter Cathedral in 1327 had a towel of this cloth. Eylisham or Ailesham in Lincolnshire was famous during the fourteenth century for linen manufacturing especially for the finer naperies.

== See also ==
- Napery
- Linen
