= Ship chandler =

Retail dealer who specialises in ships' supplies or equipment

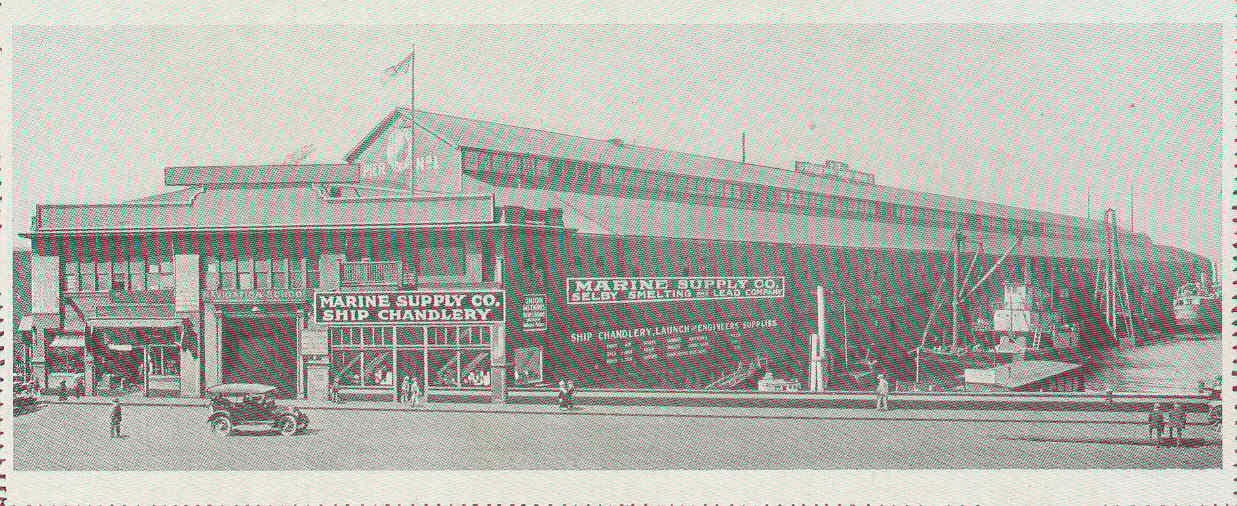
1917 photograph of Marine Supply Co., Pier 1, Seattle. Ship Chandlery, Marine Hardware, Cannery and Engineers' Supplies.

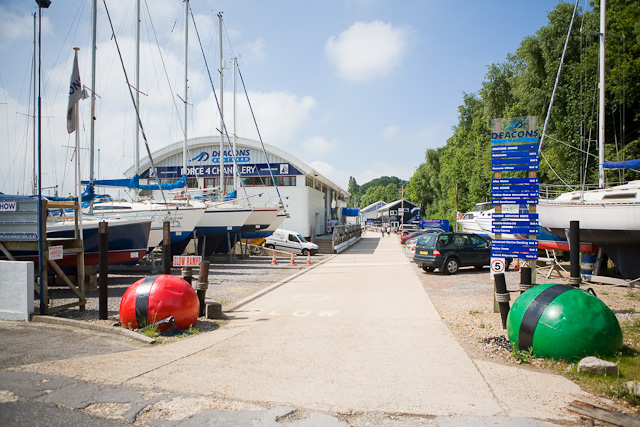
Deacons Boat Yard and Force 4 Chandlery, in Hampshire

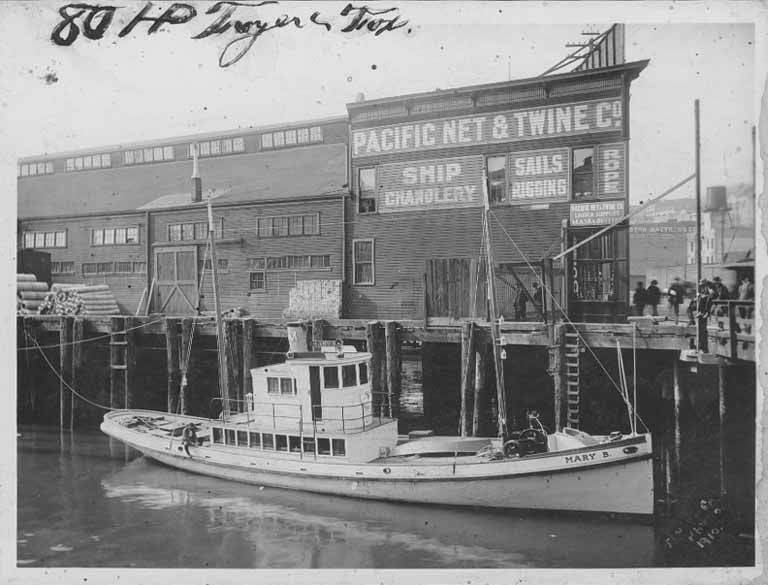
Boat Mary B. moored beside the Pacific Net and Twine Company in Seattle, which sold sails, rigging, and ship's chandlery items

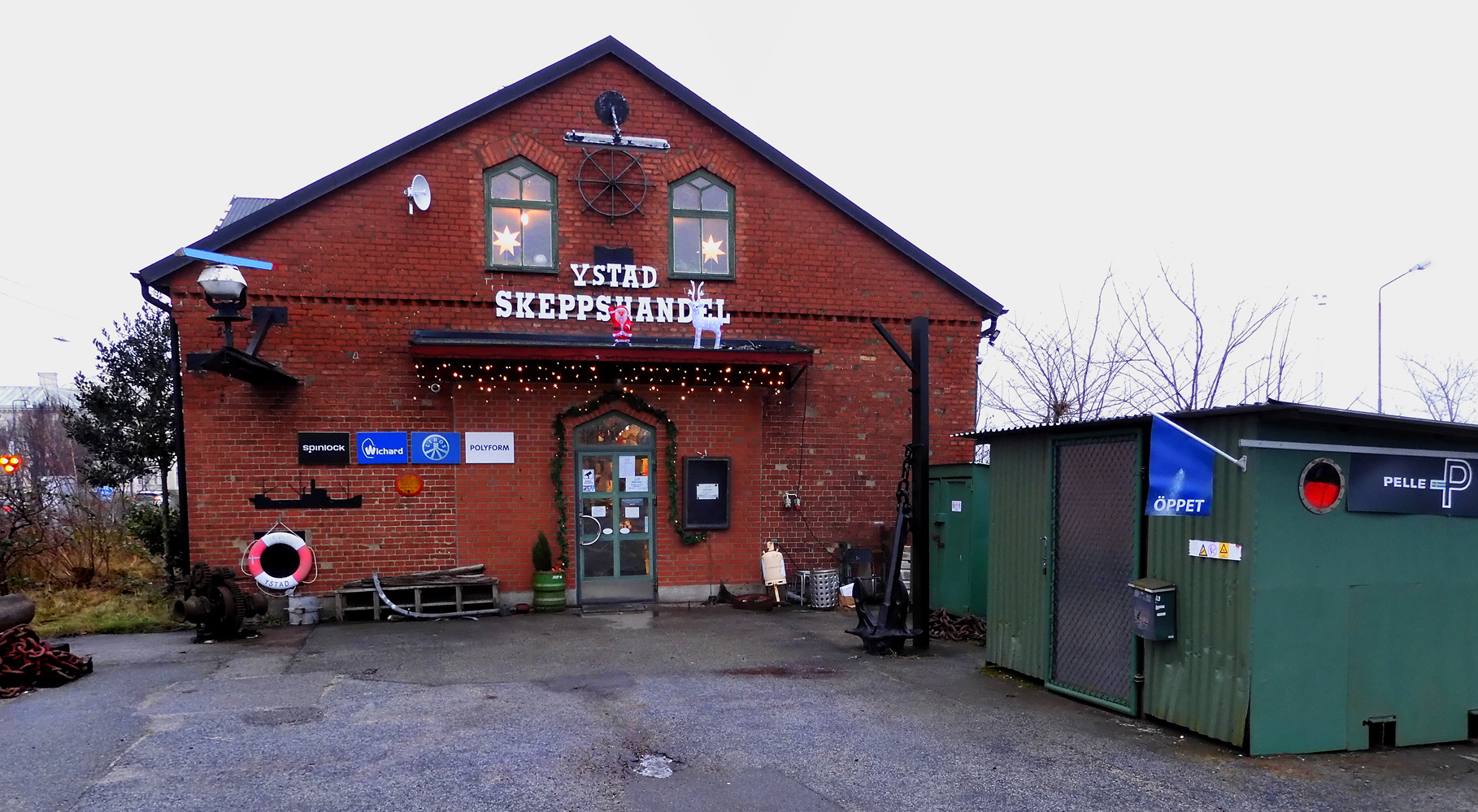
Ystads ship chandler 2021

A ship chandler is a retail dealer who specializes in providing supplies or equipment for ships.

== Synopsis ==
For traditional sailing ships, items that could be found in a chandlery include sail-cloth, rosin, turpentine, tar, pitch, linseed oil, whale oil, tallow, lard, varnish, twine, rope and cordage, hemp, and oakum. Tools (hatchet, axe, hammer, chisel, planes, lantern, nails, spike, boat hook, caulking iron, hand pump, and marlinspike) and cleaning items, such as brooms and mops, might be available. Galley supplies, leather goods, and paper might also appear. In the Age of Sail, ship chandlers could be found on remote islands, such as St. Helena, who were responsible for delivering water and fresh produce to stave off scurvy.

Today's chandlery deals more in goods typical of fuel-powered commercial ships (oil tankers, container ships, and bulk carriers), including maintenance supplies, cleaning compounds, and food stores for the crew.

A distinguishing feature of a ship chandler is the high level of service demanded and the short time required to fill and deliver orders. Commercial ships discharge and turn around quickly; delay is expensive, making the services of a dependable ship chandler in great demand. Advantages, both today and in the past, are that stores in unfamiliar ports do not need to be sought out, and lines of credit make currency exchange a non-issue. (Usually, a ship owner would establish a line of credit with the chandler and then be billed for anything delivered to the crew.) Chandlers also deliver the product, freeing up crew to work on repairs or, if allowed, take shore leave.

The ship chandlery business was central to the existence and social and political dynamics of ports and their waterfronts. Nearby merchants typically supply ship chandlers.

== Gallery ==
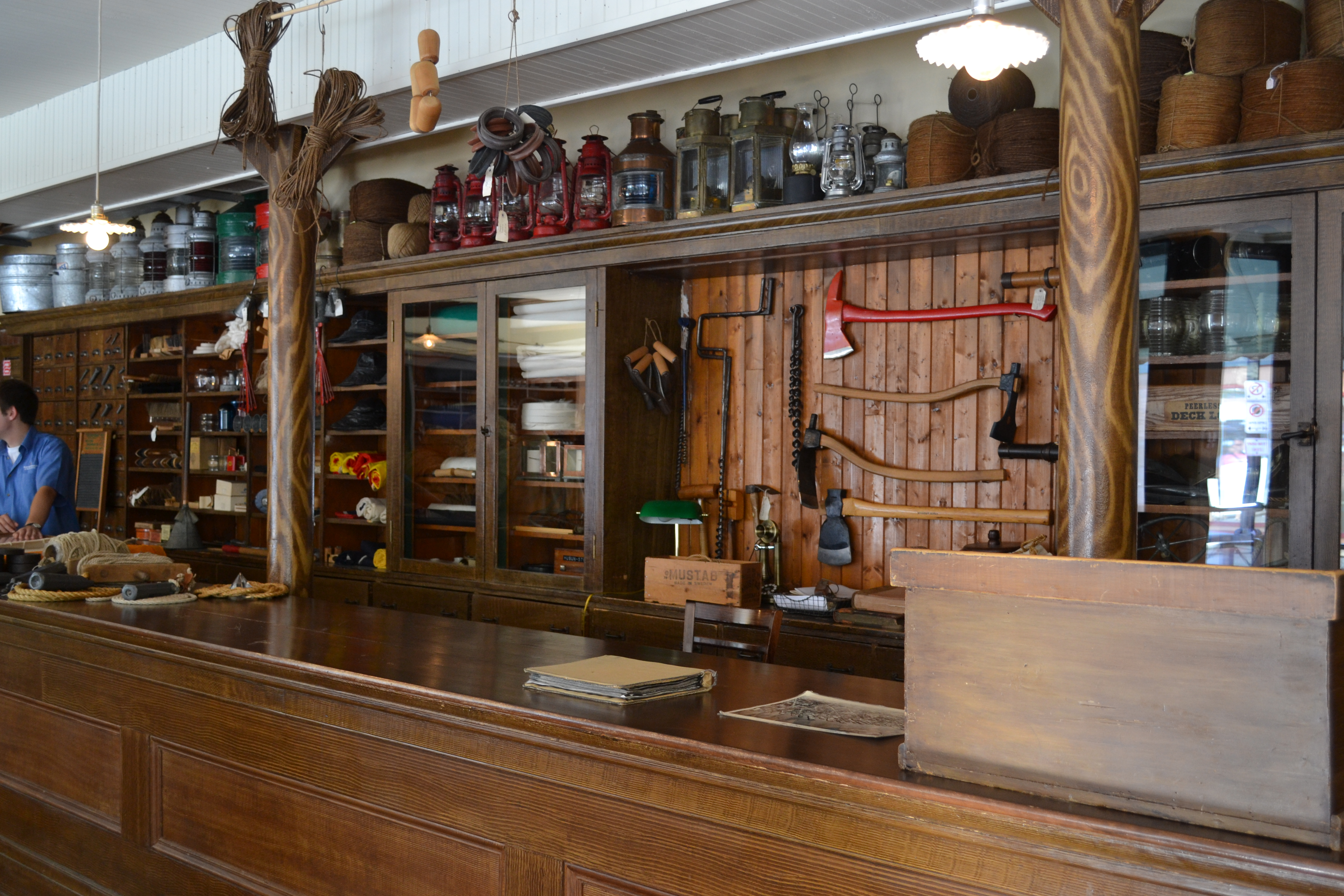
Restored ship chandlery, c. 1900, at the Maritime Museum of the Atlantic in Halifax, Nova Scotia

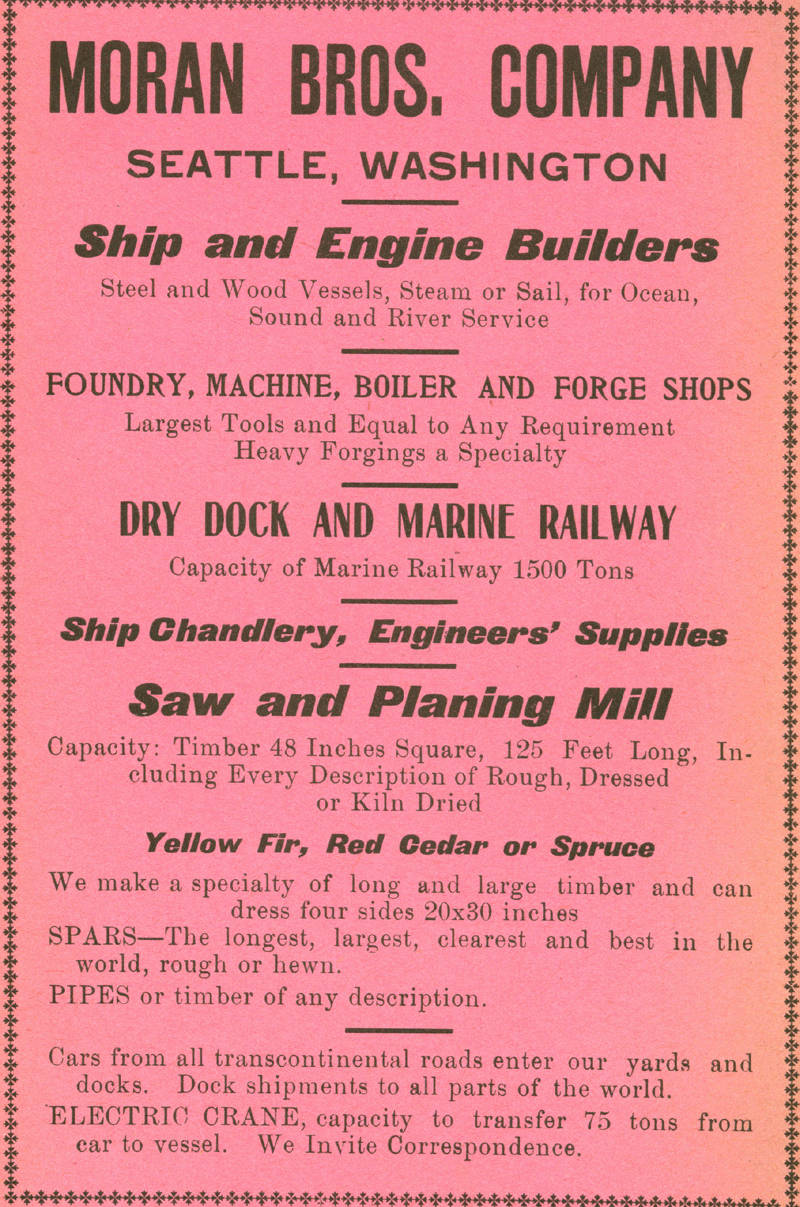
A 1900 advertisement from the Moran Brothers included ship's chandlery items as part of a marine refit business.

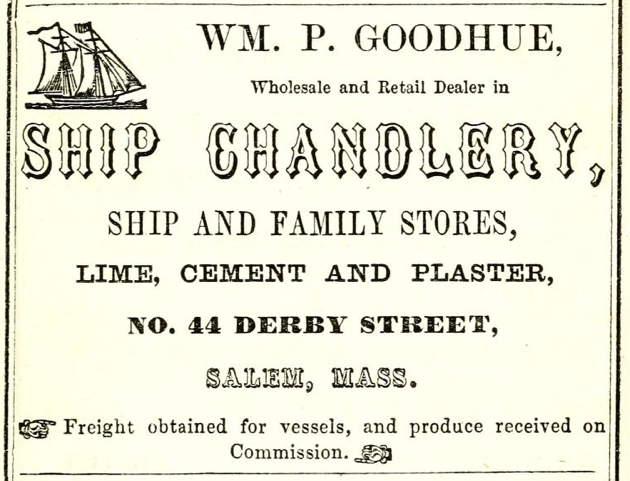
Wm. P. Goodhue advertised in 1857 his Derby St Salem, MA ship's chandlery business.

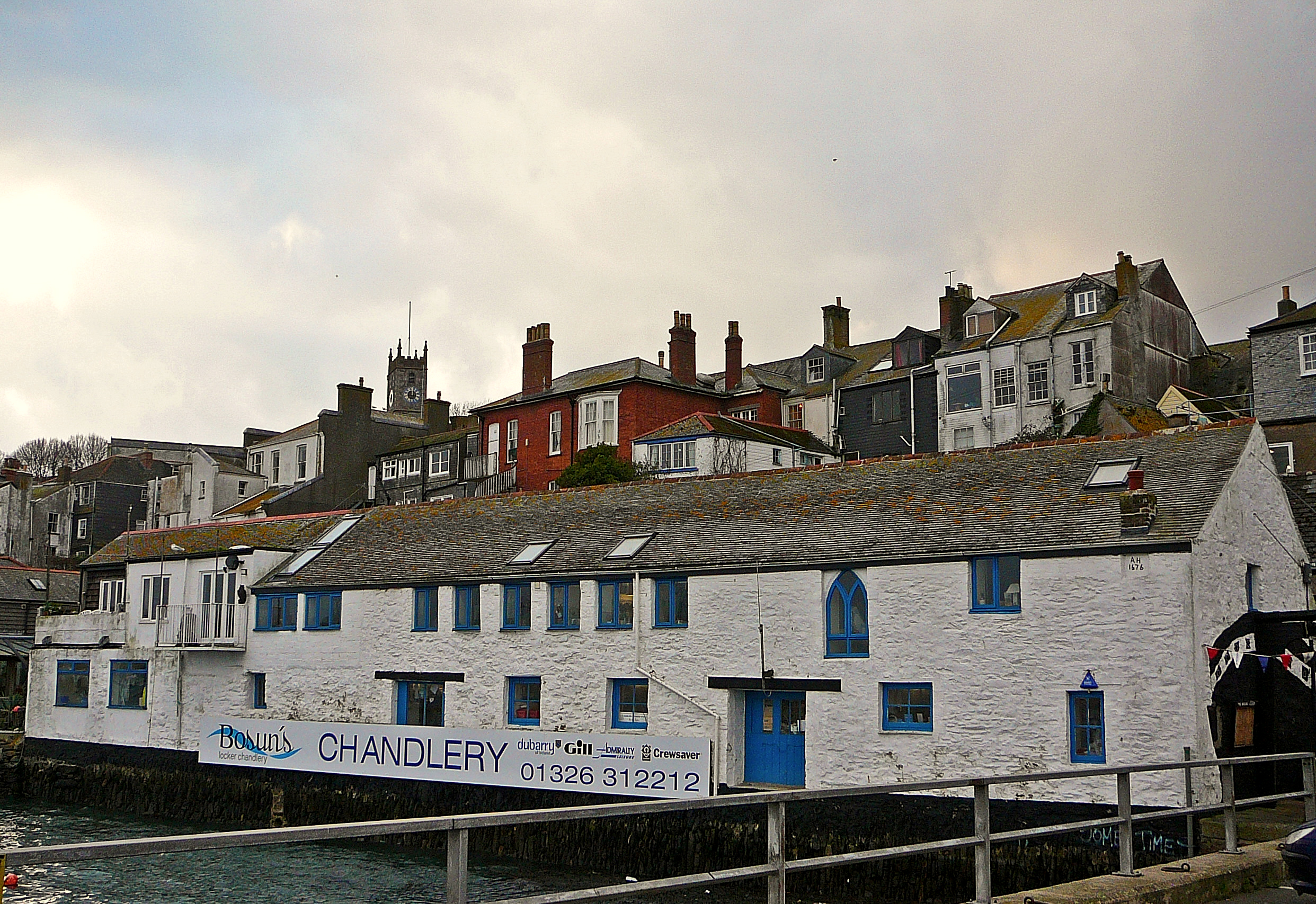
The Bosun's Locker business advertises their ship's chandlery right on the waterfront of port in Falmouth, Cornwall.

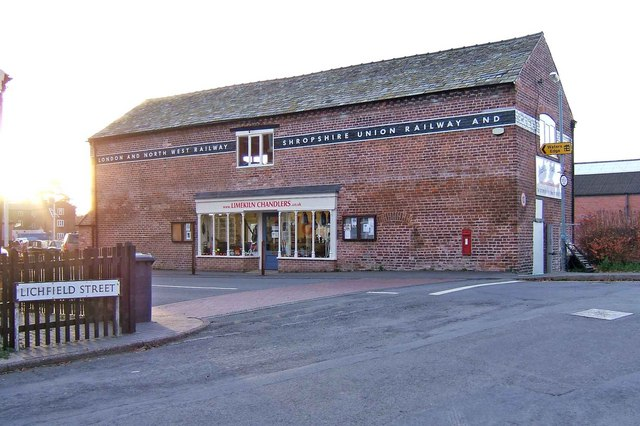
Limekiln Chandlery of Lichfield Street occupies what was once a railway station at Stourport-on-Severn.

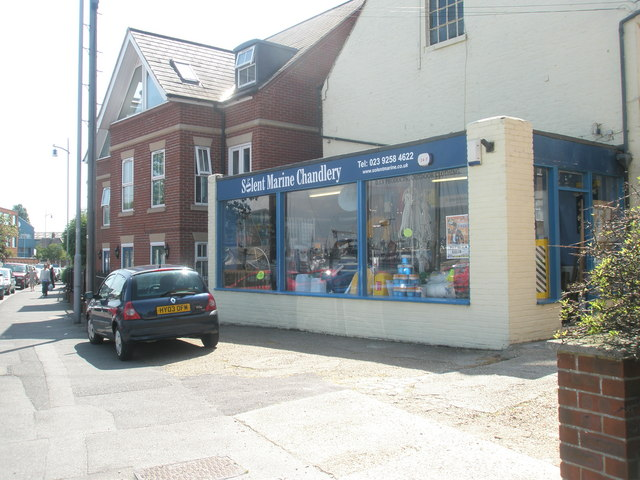
Solent Marine Chandlery in Mumby Road is a fixture on the Gosport side of Portsmouth Harbour.

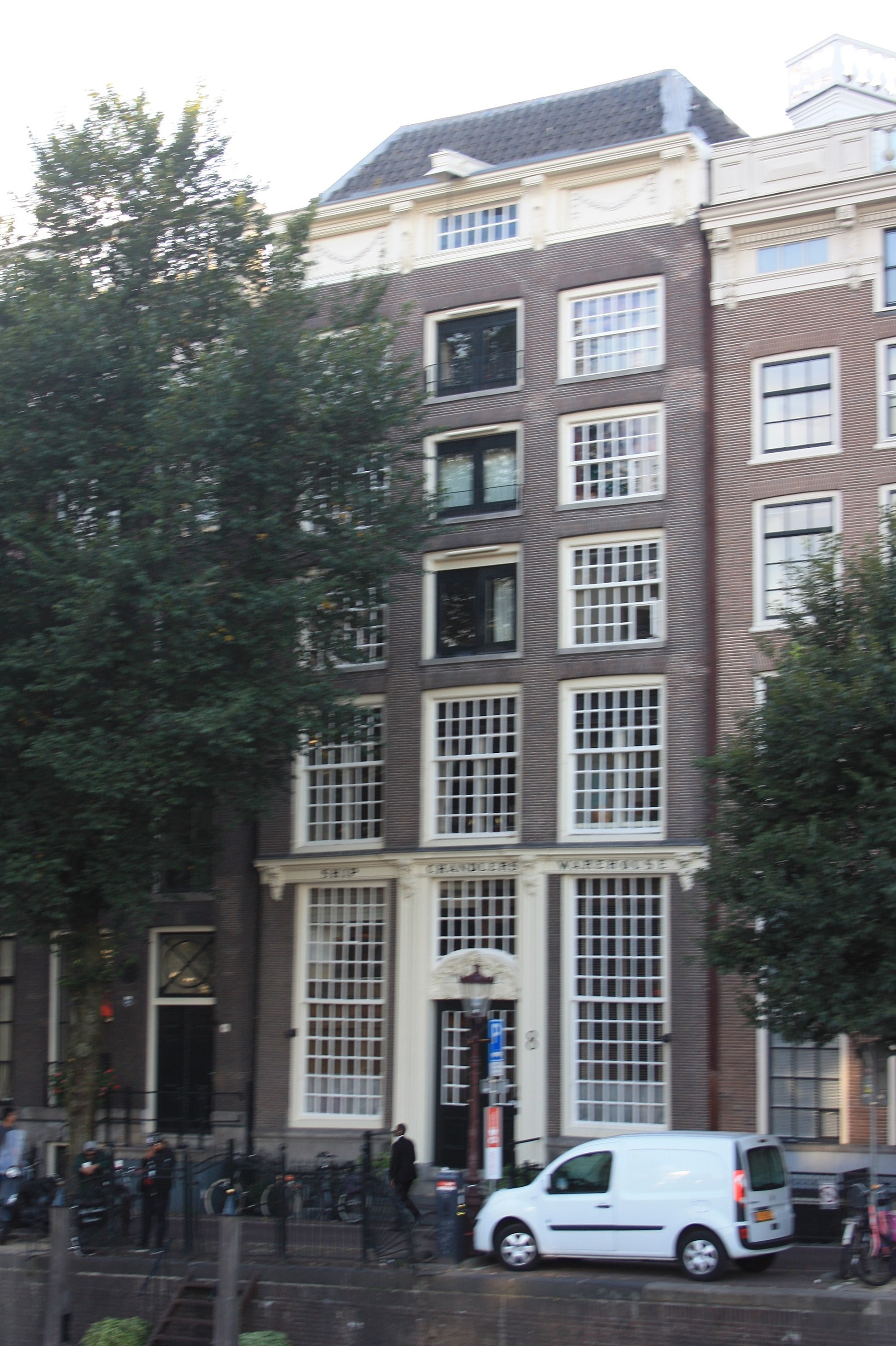
Seventeenth-century ship's chandler, Amsterdam

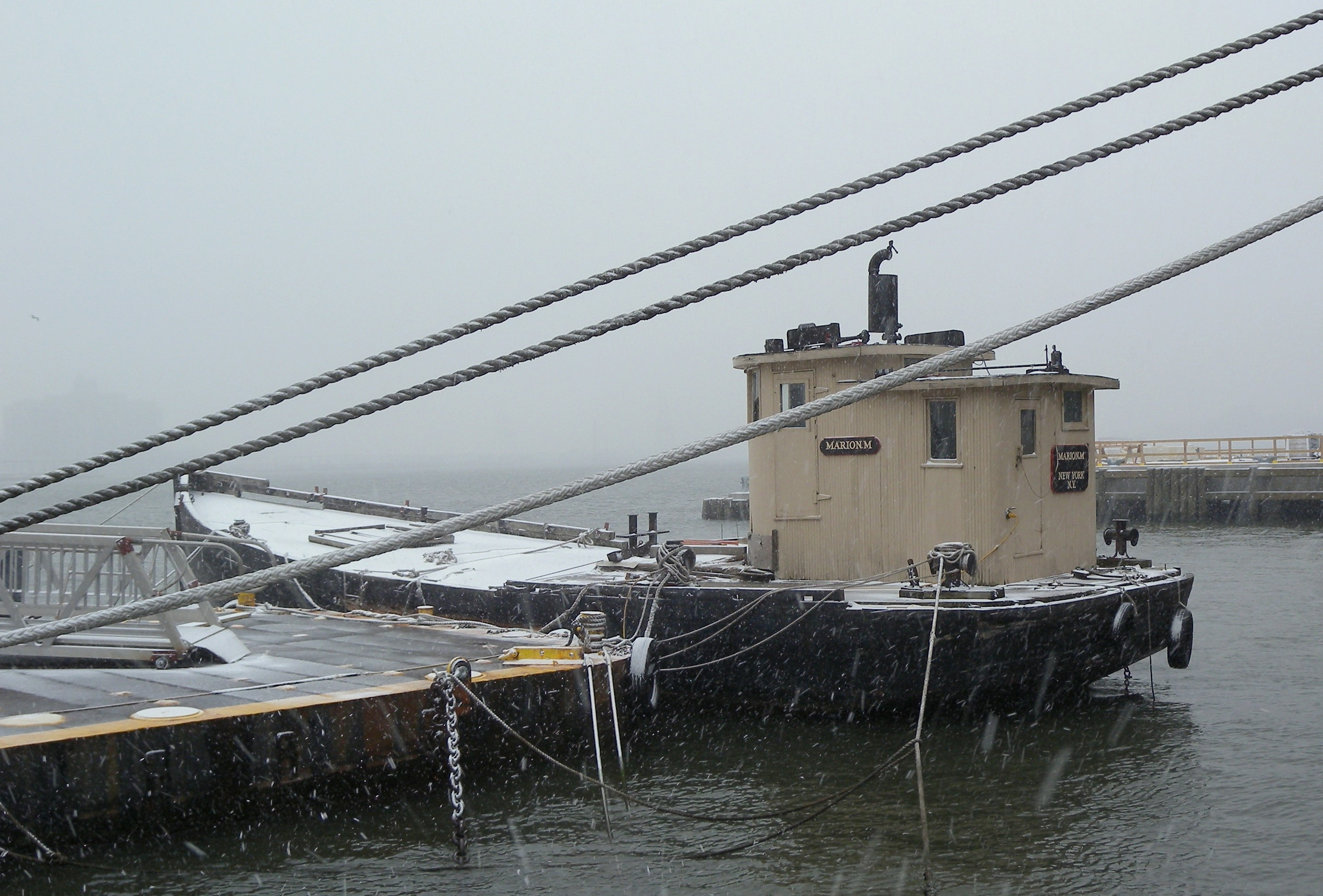
1932 chandler's lighter, now a museum piece
