= Pig scalder =

Tool to soften the skin of a dead pig

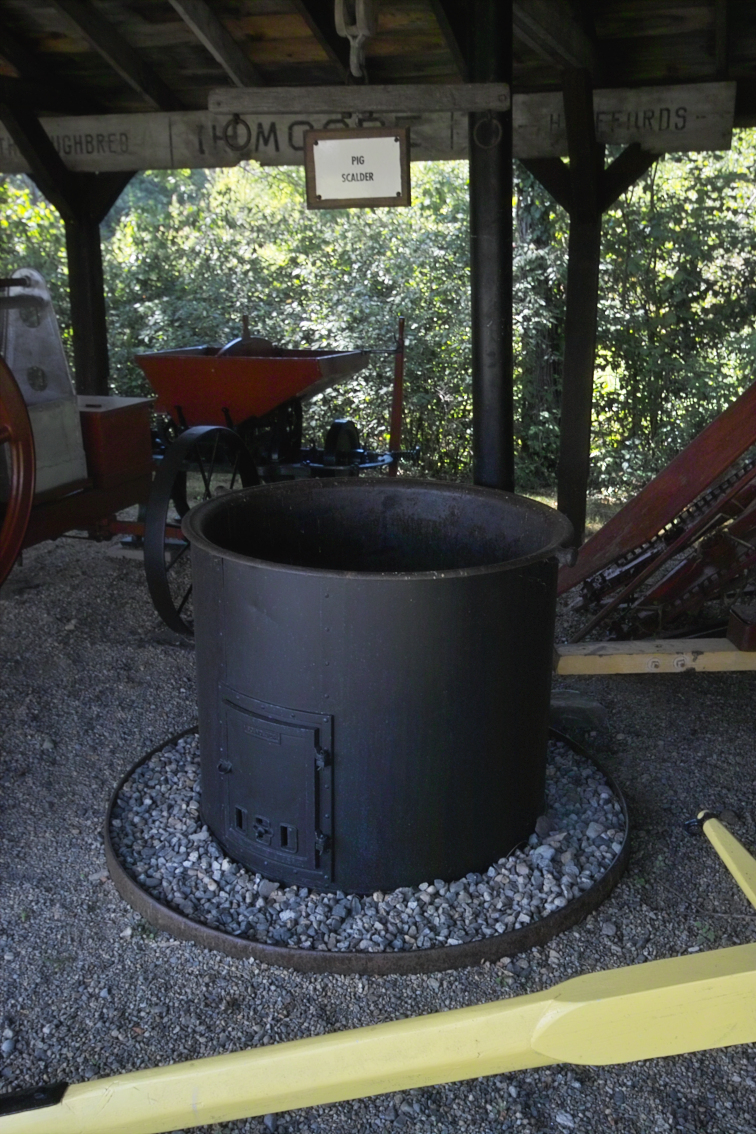
A pig scalder at Willowbrook Museum Village

A pig scalder is a tool that is used to soften the skin of a pig after they have been killed. It also removes the hair from their skin. Since people hardly ever slaughter and process their own pigs anymore, pig scalders are rarely used domestically.

Modern swine processing plants use industrial scalders as part of their slaughterhouse process.

There were many shapes and sizes for scalders. They varied by the materials used to construct them and how much was spent on them. In general, a pig scalder looks like a very large pot or tub. It would be made of wood or metal, though a metal scalder allowed users to build a fire underneath in order to heat the water inside. In New Zealand, many farmers use their old cast iron bathtubs for this job, but the tubs are becoming harder to acquire. Metal scalders were also easier to clean after use.

== See also ==
- Pig slaughter
- Scalding-house
