= Scalding-house =

Mediaeval office

A scalding house was the office in a medieval household responsible for scalding the carcasses of animals, as well as utensils. It was also the room in which this activity took place. It was headed by a scalder. The office was subordinated to the kitchen, and existed as a separate office only in larger households. It was closely connected with other offices of the kitchen, such as the saucery and the scullery.

== See also ==
- Pig scalder
