= Chandlery =

Medieval household office responsible for wax and candles

A chandlery (/ˈtʃændləri/ or /ˈtʃɑːnd-/) was originally the establishment in a wealthy medieval household responsible for wax and candles, as well as the room in which the candles were kept. It could be headed by a chandler. The office was subordinated to the kitchen, and only existed as a separate office in larger households.

Whether a separate office or not, the function was naturally an important one, in a time before electric light, and when production of candles was often done privately. It was closely connected with other offices of the household, such as the ewery and the scullery. While this usage is obsolete today, the term can refer to a candle-trade establishment. The current meaning of "chandler" is a person who sells candles.

By the 18th century, most commercial chandlers dealt in candles, oils, soap, and even paint. As these provided ship's stores, chandlery came to refer to a shop selling nautical items for ships and boats, although for a time they were called ship-chandleries to distinguish them. Speakers of American English used the term chandlery for these ship-chandleries, but tended to prefer the term chandler's shop. Both terms remain in use.

The job-function and title of chandler, still exists as applying to someone who works in the chandlery trade or who manages a chandler's shop. The term chandelier, at one time a ceiling fixture that held a number of candles, is still used. However, today chandeliers are usually based on electrical lighting.

== See also ==
- History of candle making
