= Buttery (room) =

Originally a room under a monastery, in which food and drink were stored

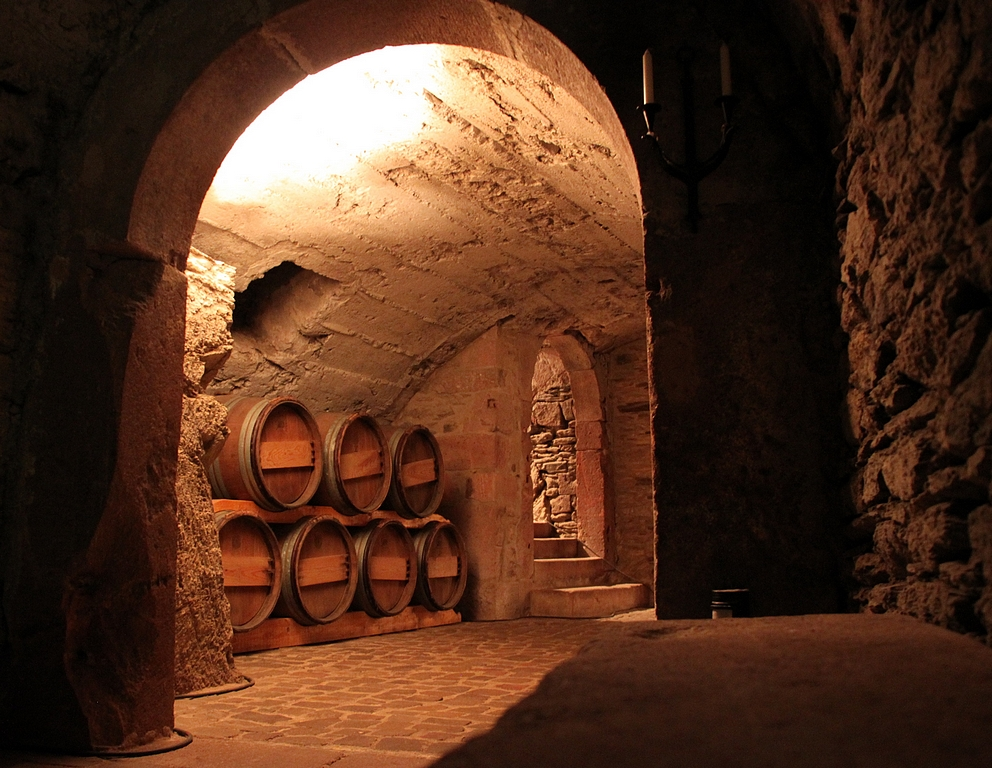
Rochlitz Castle, Germany, basement wine cellar, perhaps providing an idea of the mediaeval buttery

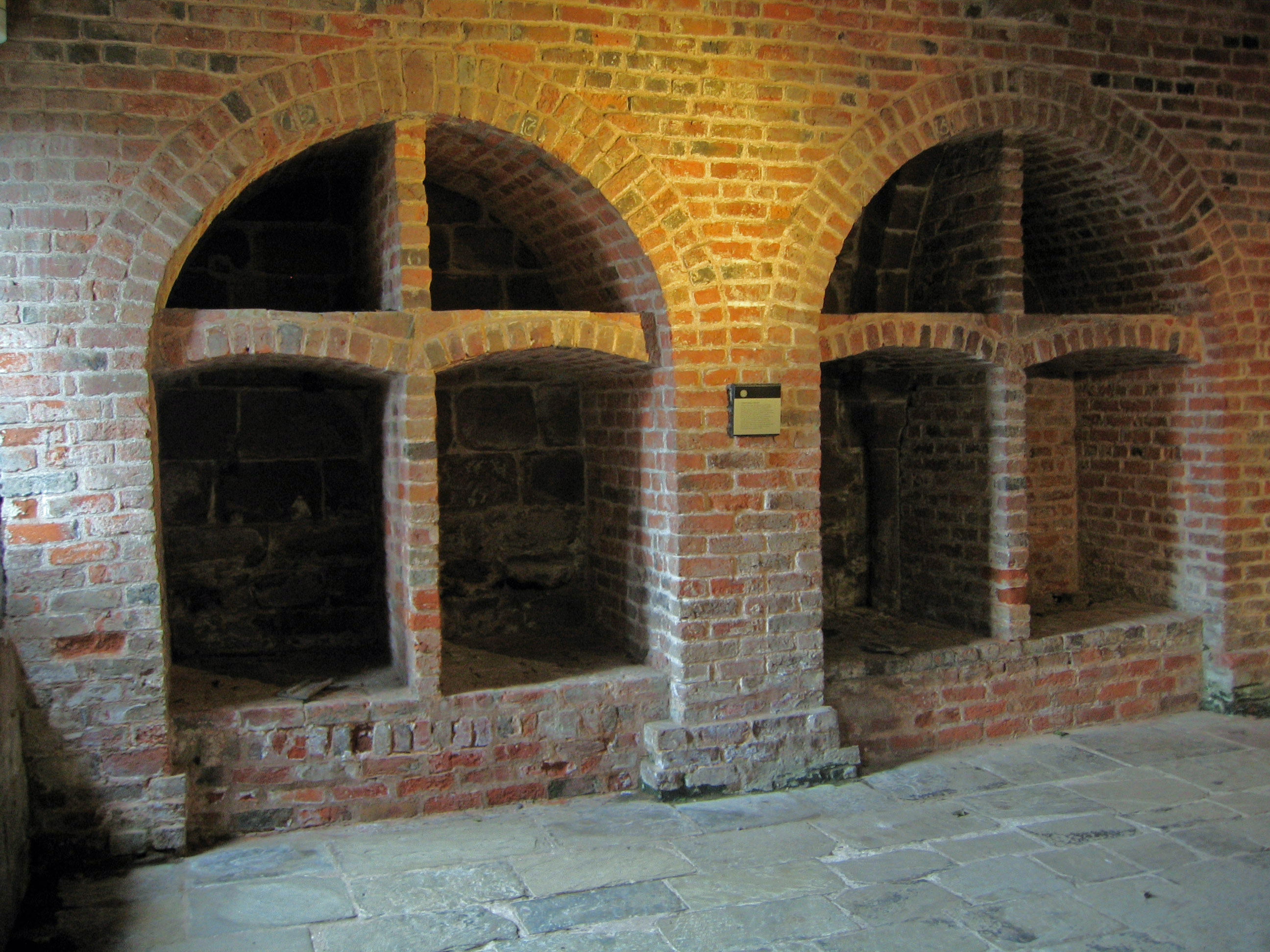
Wine bins in the undercroft of Norton Priory, near Runcorn, Cheshire, an example of a wine storage area in a historic domestic setting

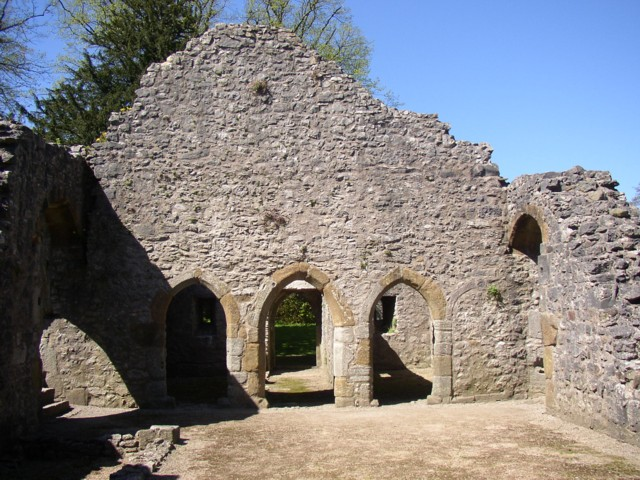
The classic layout of an important mediaeval house, showing three doorways to service rooms, Old Rectory, Warton. These doorways are here seen from inside the Great Hall, but would originally have been hidden by the wooden screen of the screens passage. The central doorway leads into a passage to an outside kitchen. The other two doors are to the pantry and buttery

A buttery was originally a large cellar room under a monastery, in which food and drink were stored for the provisioning of strangers and passing guests. Nathan Bailey's An Universal Etymological English Dictionary gives "CELLARIST – one who keeps a Cella, or Buttery; the Butler in a religious House or Monastery." As the definition in John Stevens's The History of the Antient Abbeys shows, its initial function was to feed and water the guests rather than monks: "The Buttery; the Lodging for Guests". In a monastery a buttery was thus the place from which travellers would seek 'doles' of bread and weak ale, given at the exterior buttery door (and often via a small serving-hatch in the door, to prevent invasion of the stores by a crowd or by rough beggars). The task of doling out this free food and drink would be the role of the butterer. At larger monasteries there would also be a basic hostelry, where travellers could sleep for free.

Later the term buttery was also applied to a similar stores-room in a large medieval house, which might or might not be a cellar, and in which the buttery served the lord and his household rather than only passing travellers.

In both its uses, a buttery is to be distinguished from the butter and lard-house (pantry or larder), and the kitchen, a hostelry, or the refectory for guests or the dining hall for the inhabitants.

== Etymology ==
In the Middle Ages, a buttery was a storeroom for liquor, the name being derived from the Latin and French words for bottle or, to put the word into its simpler form, a butt, that is, a cask. A butler, before he became able to take charge of the ewery, pantry, cellar, and the staff, would be in charge of the buttery.

== Location ==
After the dissolution of the monasteries, the buttery in large houses and colleges became a place for barrels, bottles, or butts of alcoholic drink, and from which they were brought up and served into the Great Hall. The buttery was then situated to one side of the screens passage, which sectioned off the low end of the Great Hall. The screens passage generally had two or three doors on the side opposite its entrances into the Great Hall, which led, respectively, to the buttery, kitchen, and pantry, each of which formed separate household departments.

== Function ==
In a large house, the buttery's principal function was storage of wine and its preparation for serving. Candles were also dispensed from the buttery, as was beer, to those lower members of the household not entitled to drink wine. Today in colleges in Cambridge, Dublin, and Oxford, drinks are served from the "Buttery Bar". The buttery generally had a staircase to the beer cellar below. The wine-storage area of the buttery, in keeping with the higher value of its contents, was often more richly decorated to reflect the higher status of its function.

== Role of the butler ==
Later the monk butterer became the smartly suited "butler" that we know today, the household officer in charge of the buttery, and possibly also its provisioner (i.e., the sourcing and purchasing of wine). In the royal household the "Marshal of the Buttery" was often a post discharged under the feudal land tenure of grand serjeanty. In less important households such an officer was termed the yeoman of the buttery. Later, as household staff in the great houses became reduced, the butler also became required to personally serve wine to his lord and guests at banquets.

== Decline ==
From the mid-17th century, as it became the custom for servants and their offices to be less conspicuous and sited far from the principal reception rooms, the Great Hall and its neighbouring buttery and pantry lost their original uses. While the Great Hall often became a grand staircase hall or large reception hall (as at Powderham Castle in Devon), the smaller buttery and pantry beyond the screens passage were often amalgamated to form a further reception or dining room.

== Modern use ==
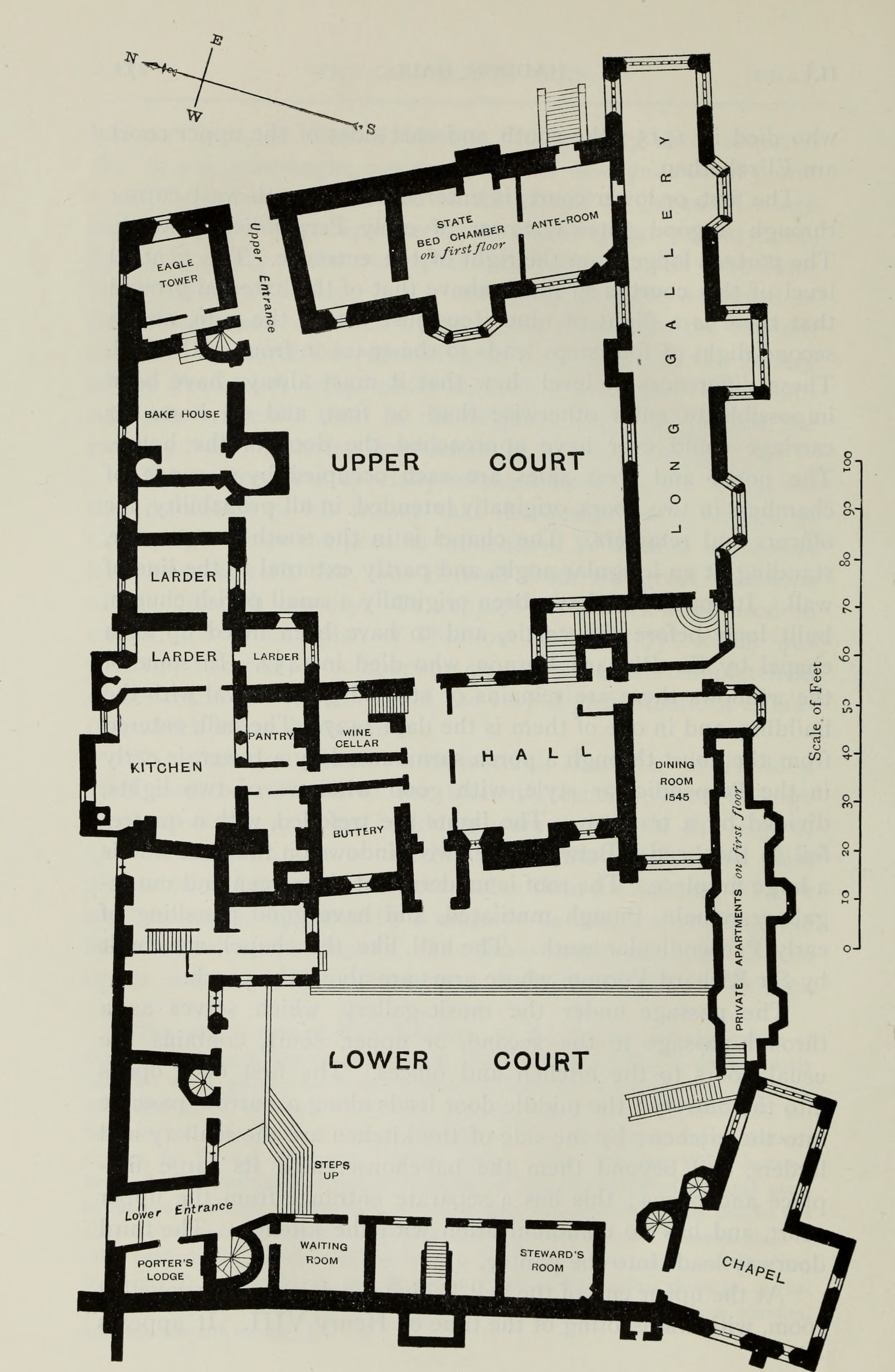
The buttery is typically located close to a dining hall as in this example from Haddon Hall, Derbyshire; ground plan from 1886

Most Oxford and Cambridge colleges, University College and Trevelyan College, Durham, King's College London, the University of Bristol and Trinity College, Dublin call their eating places butteries to this day, as do a few schools in the United Kingdom. The communal kitchens/dining rooms in Goodenough College, a postgraduate student residence hall in central London are called butteries, one example being "the Princess Alice Buttery" in William Goodenough House.

The residential colleges of Yale also refer to their snack bars by this name. Trinity College at the University of Toronto also uses the name to refer to its cafeteria located in the Larkin building. Bruce Hall at the Australian National University also maintains a buttery, which is an informal canteen and bar. The Bar of the Junior Common Room at Trinity College, The University of Melbourne, is known as The Buttery. St. John's College, University of Manitoba refers to the dining area in its residence hall as The Buttery.

== Bibliography ==
- Girouard, Mark (1978). Life in the English Country House. Yale University Press. ISBN 0-300-02273-5.
