= Saucery =

Medieval office of sauce preparation

A saucery was the office in a medieval household responsible for sauces, as well as the room in which the preparation of sauces took place. It was headed by a saucerer. The office was subordinated to the kitchen, and existed as a separate office only in larger households. It was closely connected with other offices of the kitchen, such as the spicery and the scullery. The term is largely obsolete today.

== See also ==
- Condiment
- Sorcery (disambiguation)
- Saucier
