= Napery =

Linen used for household purposes, such as table linen

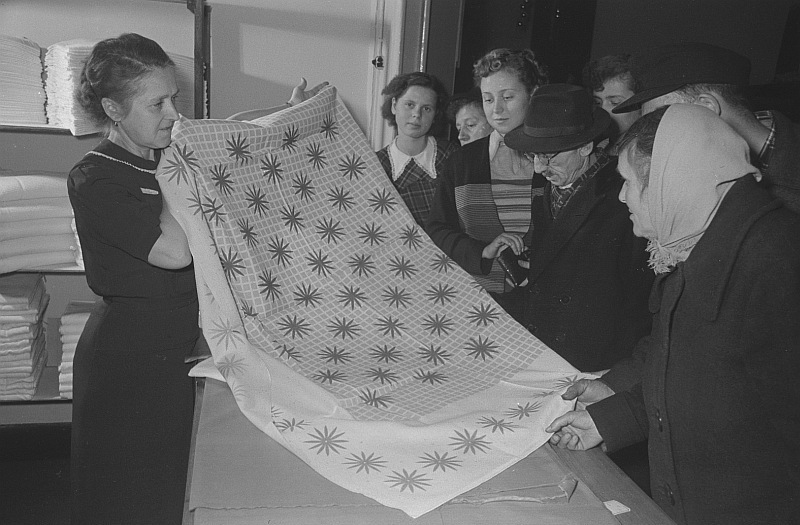
A shopkeeper shows a tablecloth to customers in Leipzig, November 1953

Napery (from Old French naperie) is linen used for household purposes, such as table linen. Historically it was the office in a medieval household responsible for the washing and storage of these items. It was headed by a naperer. This office worked closely together with the offices of the laundry (washing and storage of clothing) and the ewery (water and the vessels for drinking or washing of the person), and the three could be concurrent in smaller households.

== See also ==
- Ailesham cloth
- Napier (surname)
