= Spicery =

Person and place related to spice storage

A spicery was the office in a medieval or Renaissance household responsible for spices, as well as the room in which the spices were kept. It was headed by a spicerer. The office was subordinated to the kitchen or the wardrobe, and existed as a separate office only in larger households. It was closely connected with other offices of the kitchen, such as the saucery and the scullery. The term is largely obsolete today, and if used at all is more often simply a synonym for spices.
