= Ewery =

Medieval occupation in an English household

A ewery was the office in a wealthy medieval English household responsible for water and the vessels for drinking or washing of the person. The word derives from "ewer", a type of pitcher. This office was not responsible for laundry, which was handled by the offices of laundry and napery (table linen). The three offices did work closely together, however, and could be concurrent in smaller households.
