= Pantry =

Room where provisions are stored

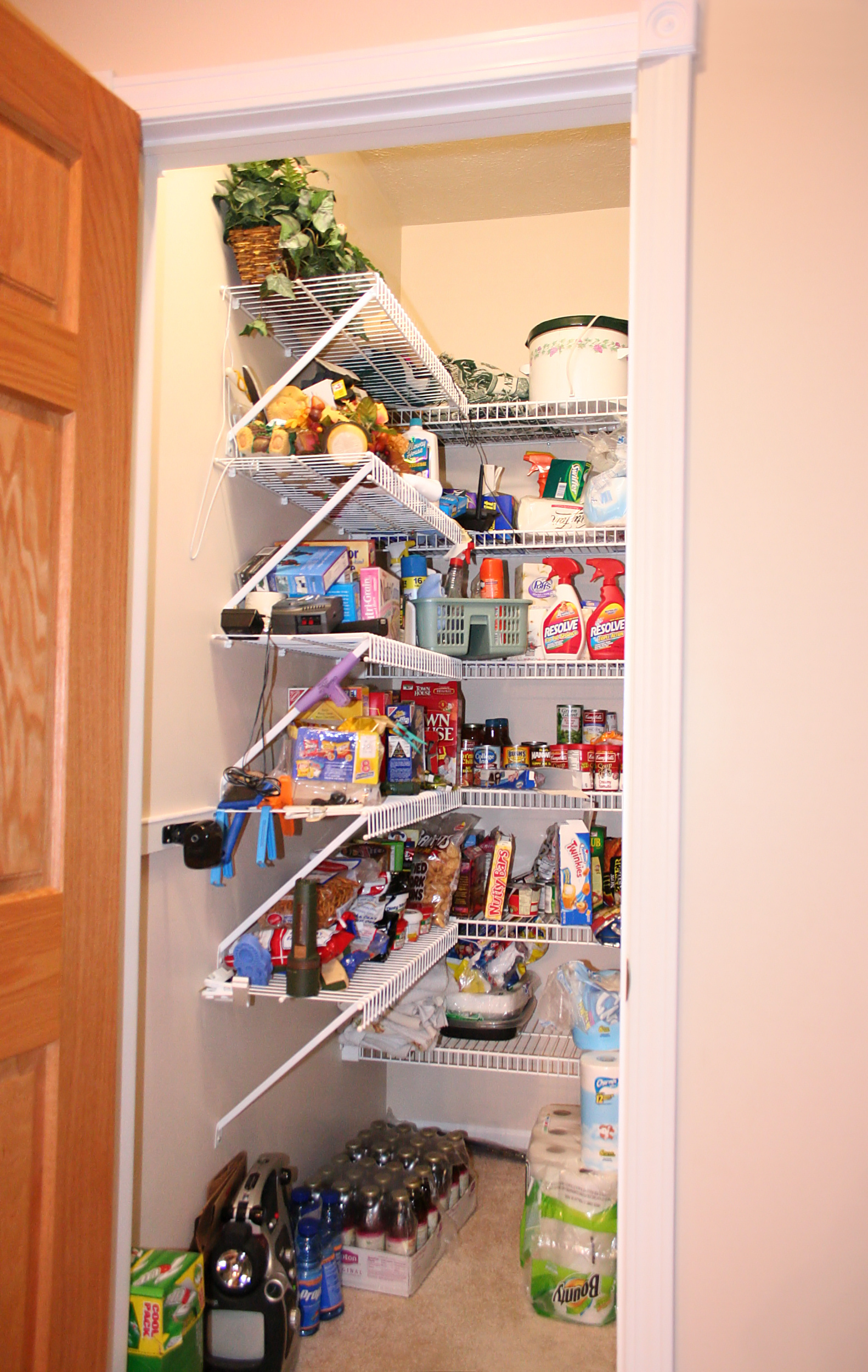
A contemporary kitchen pantry

A pantry is a room or cupboard where beverages, food, (sometimes) dishes, household cleaning products, linens or provisions are stored within a home or office. Food and beverage pantries serve in an ancillary capacity to the kitchen.

== Etymology ==
The word "pantry" derives from the same source as the Old French term paneterie; that is from pain, the French form of the Latin panis, "bread".

== History in Europe and United States ==
=== Late Middle Ages ===
In a late medieval hall, there were separate rooms for the various service functions and food storage. The pantry was a dry room where bread was kept and food preparation was done. The head of the office who is responsible for this room is referred to as a pantler. There were similar rooms for cooler storage of meats and lard/butter (larder), alcoholic beverages (buttery, known for the "butts", or barrels, stored there), and cooking (kitchen).

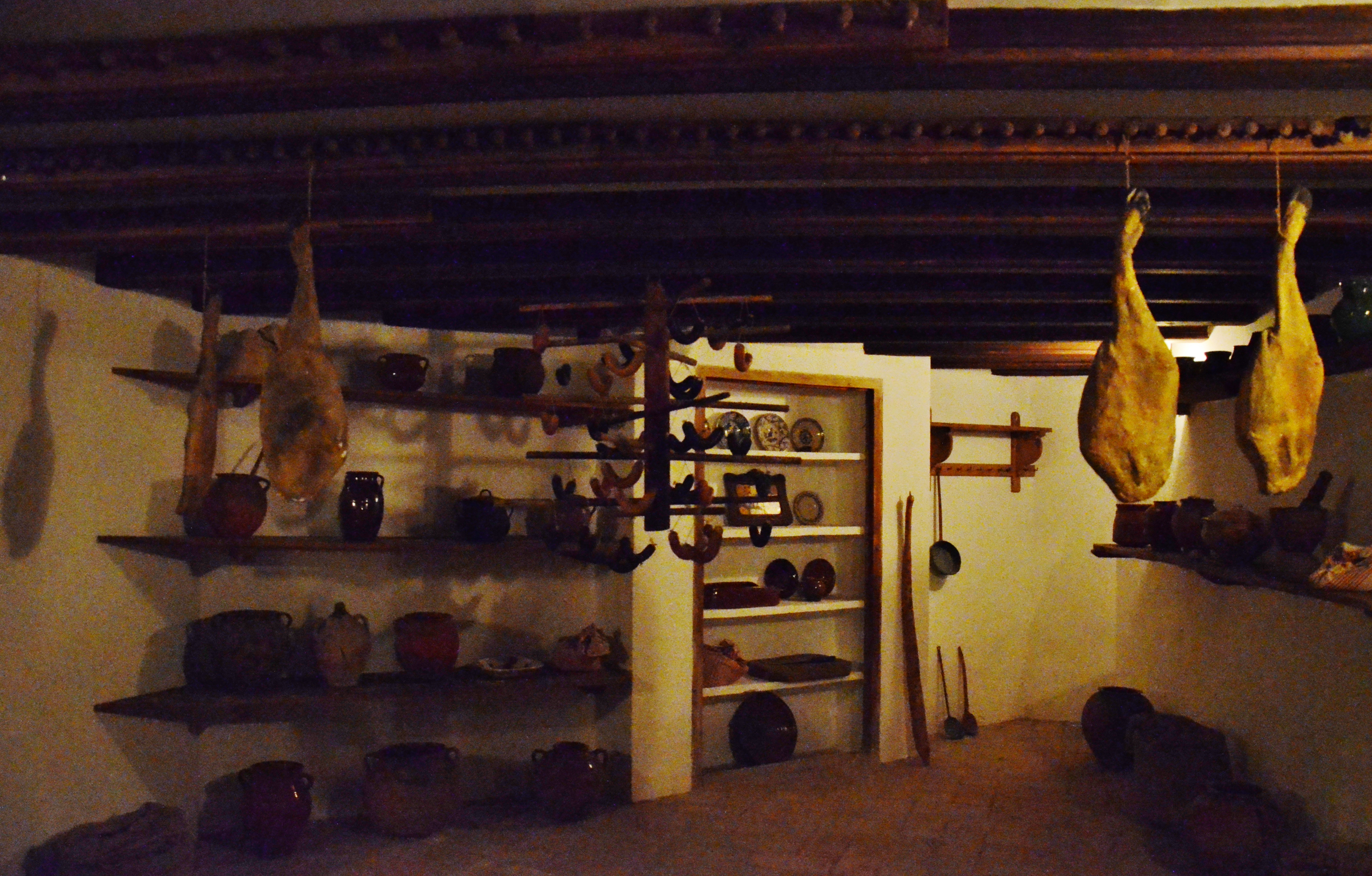
Nineteenth-century pantry in Museu Romàntic Can Papiol in Vilanova i la Geltrú

=== Colonial Era ===
In the United States, pantries evolved from early Colonial American "butteries", built in a cold north corner of a colonial home (more commonly referred to and spelled as "butt'ry"), into a variety of pantries in self-sufficient farmsteads. Butler's pantries, or China pantries, were built between the dining room and kitchen of a middle-class American home, especially in the latter part of the 19th into the early 20th centuries. Great estates, such as the Biltmore Estate in Asheville, North Carolina or Stan Hywet Hall in Akron, Ohio, had many pantries and other domestic "offices", echoing their British "great house" counterparts.

=== Victorian Era ===
By the Victorian era, large houses and estates in Britain maintained the use of separate rooms, each one dedicated to distinct stages of food preparation and cleanup. The kitchen was for cooking, while food was stored in a storeroom, pantry or cellar. Meat preparation was done in a larder as game would come in undressed, fish unfilleted, and meat in half or quarter carcasses. Vegetable cleaning and preparation would be done in the scullery. Dishwashing was done in a scullery or butler's pantry, "depending on the type of dish and level of dirt".

Since the scullery was the room with running water with a sink, it was where the messiest food preparation took place, such as cleaning fish and cutting raw meat. The pantry was where tableware was stored, such as China, glassware, and silverware. If the pantry had a sink for washing tableware, it was a wooden sink lined with lead to prevent chipping the China and glassware while they were being washed. In some middle-class houses, the larder, pantry, and storeroom might simply be large wooden cupboards, each with its exclusive purpose.

== Types ==
=== Asian Pantry ===
Traditionally, kitchens in Asia have been more open format than those of the West. The function of the pantry was generally served by wooden cabinetry. For example, in Japan, a kitchen cabinet is called a "mizuya tansu". A substantial tradition of woodworking and cabinetry in general developed in Japan, especially throughout the Tokugawa period. A huge number of designs for tansu (chests or cabinets) were made, each tailored towards one specific purpose or another. The idea is very similar to that of the Hoosier cabinet, with a wide variety of functions being served by specific design innovations.

=== Butler's pantry ===
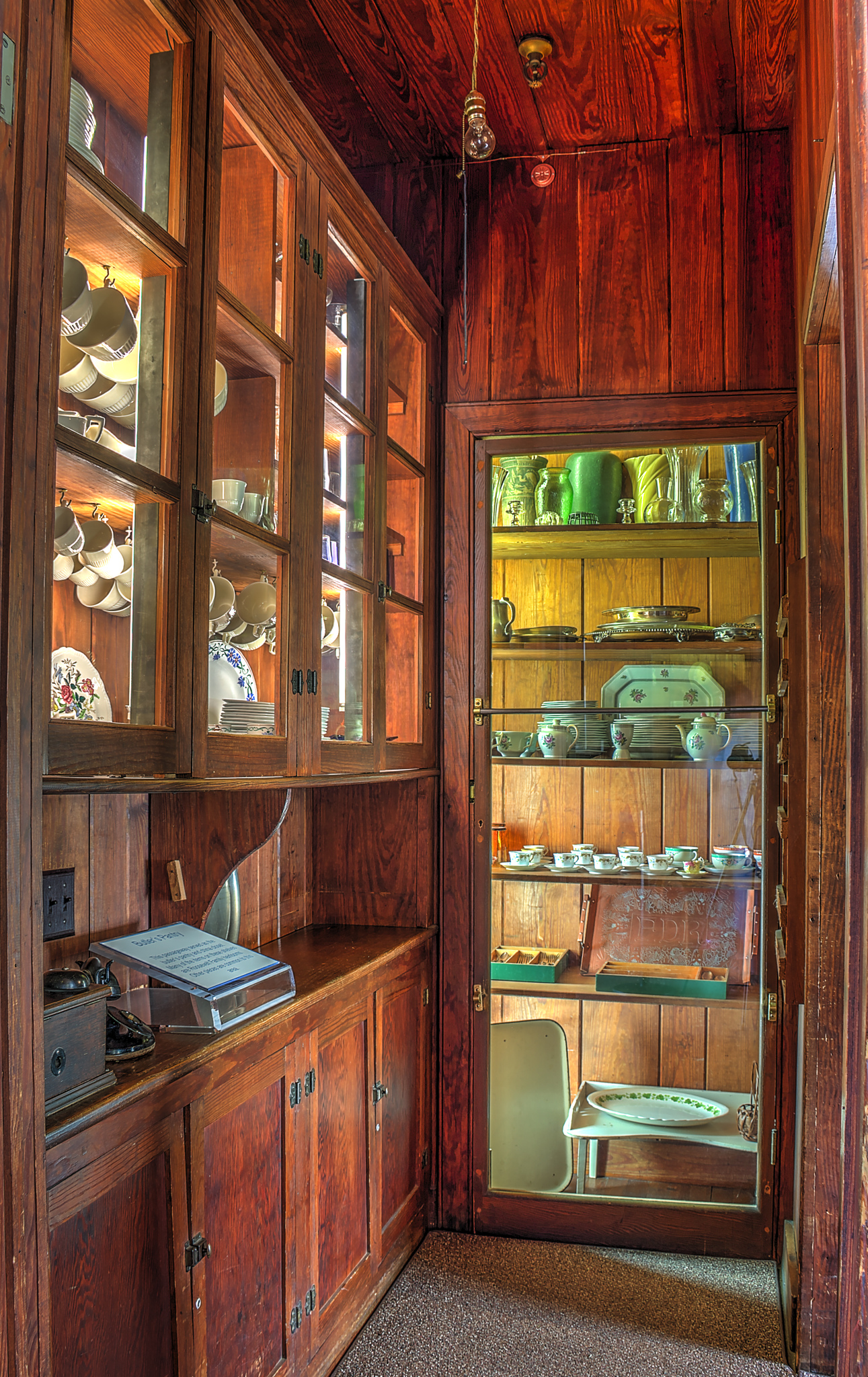
Butler's pantry at the Little White House

A butler's pantry or serving pantry is a utility room in a large house, primarily used to store serving items, rather than food. Traditionally, a butler's pantry was used for cleaning, counting, and storage of silver. European butlers often slept in the pantry, as their job was to keep the silver under lock and key. The merchant's account books and wine log may also have been kept in there. The room would be used by the butler and other domestic staff. Even in households where there is no butler, it is often called a butler's pantry.

In modern houses, butler's pantries are usually located in transitional spaces between kitchens and dining rooms and are used as staging areas for serving meals. They commonly contain countertops, as well as storage for candles, serving pieces, table linens, tableware, wine, and other dining room articles. More elaborate versions may include dishwashers, refrigerators, or sinks.

Butler's pantries have become popular in recent times.

=== Cold pantry ===
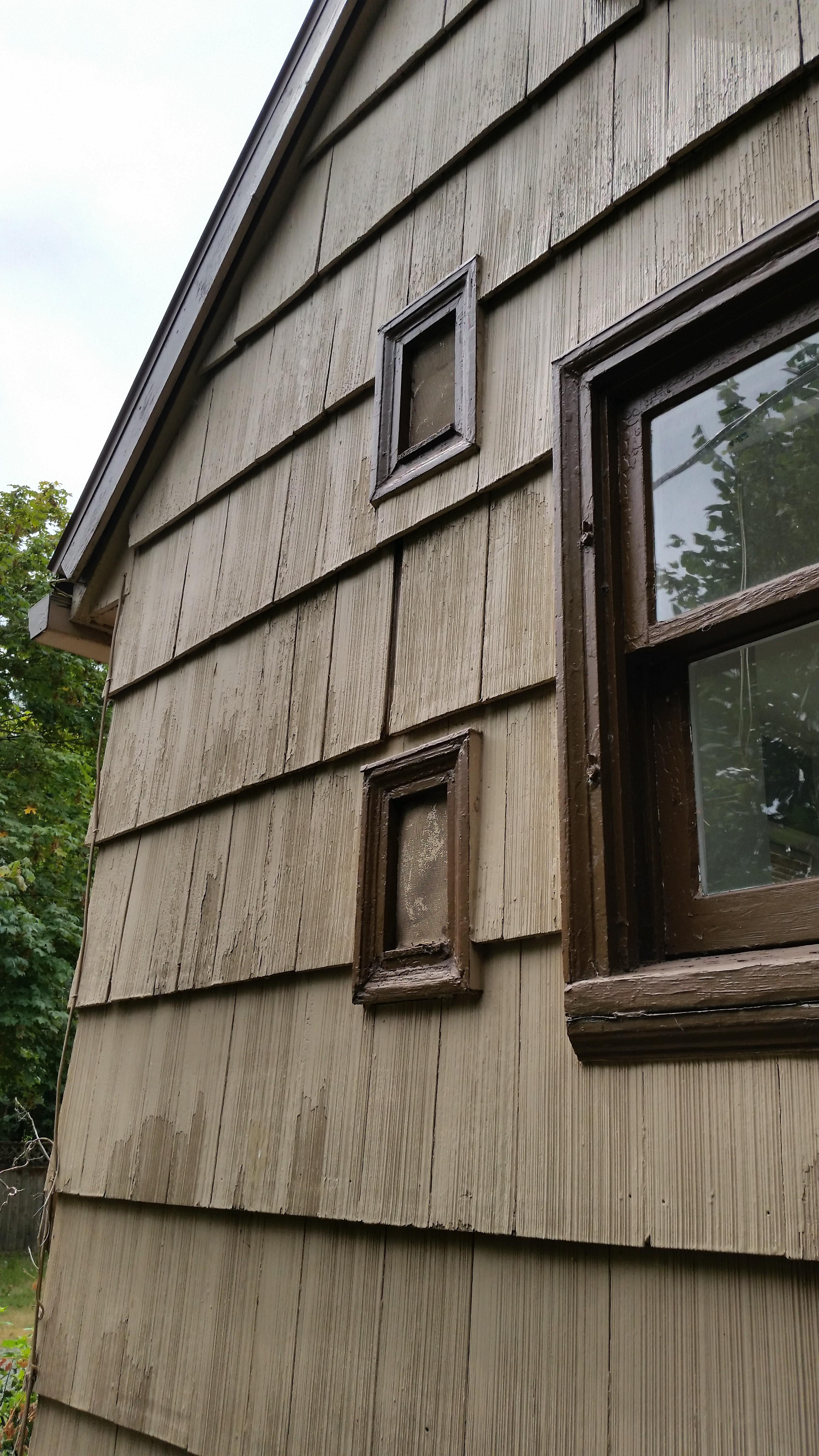
Cold pantry exterior vents

Certain foods, such as butter, eggs, and milk, need to be kept cool. Before modern refrigeration was available, iceboxes were popular. However, the problem with an icebox was that the cabinet housing was large, but the actual refrigerated space was relatively small. A clever and innovative solution was invented, the "cold pantry", sometimes called a "California cooler."

The cold pantry usually consisted of a cabinet or cupboard with wooden-slat shelves for air circulation. An opening near the top vented to the outside, either through the roof or high out the wall. A second opening near the bottom vented also to the outside, but low near the ground and usually on the north side of the house, where the air was cooler. As the air in the pantry warmed, it rose, escaping through the upper vent. This in turn drew cooler air in from the lower vent, providing constant circulation of cooler air. In the summertime, the temperature in the cold pantry would usually hover several degrees lower than the ambient temperature in the house, while in the wintertime, the temperature in the cold pantry would be considerably lower than that in the house.

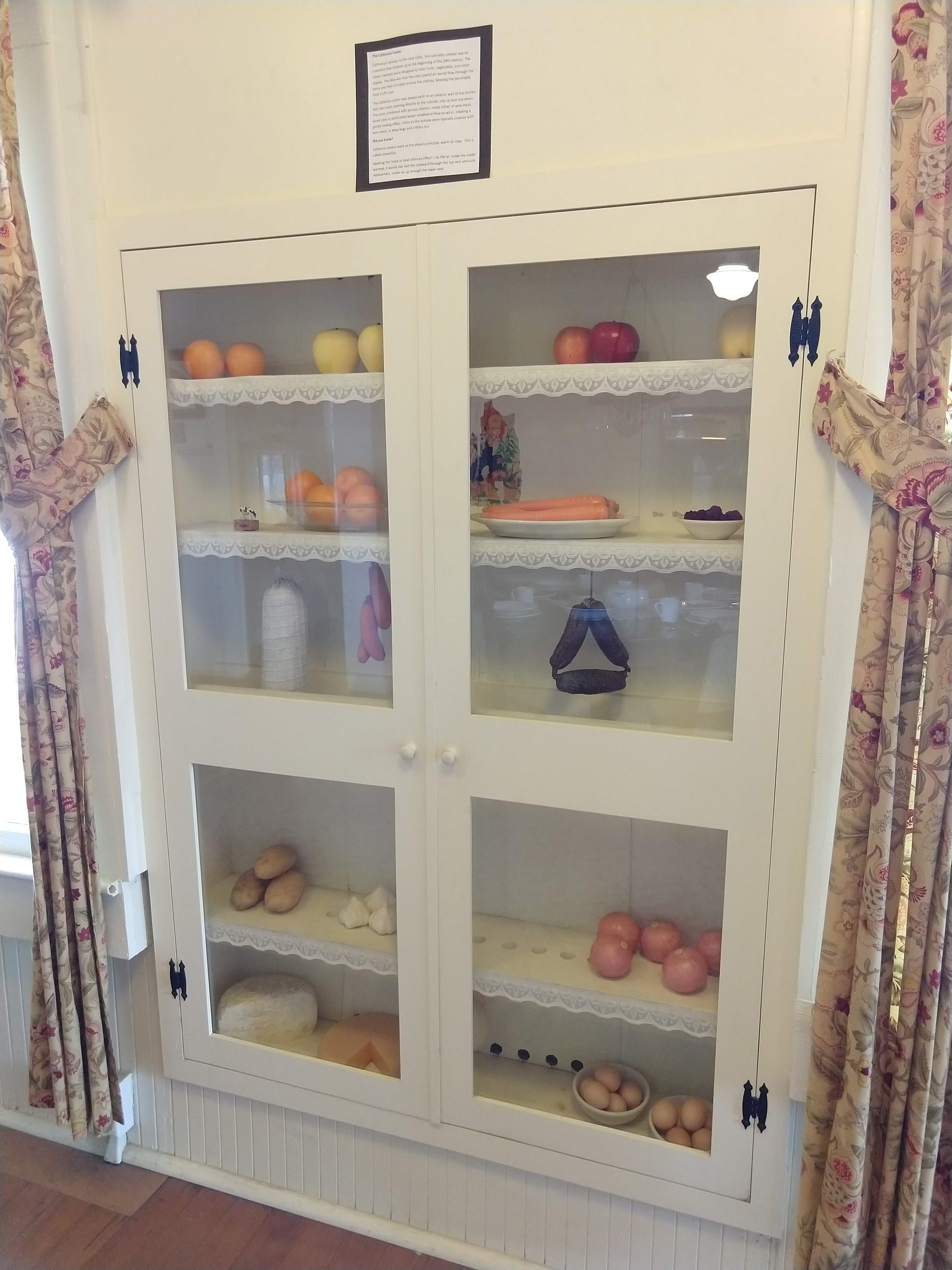
A California cooler in the Spooner Ranch House in Montaña de Oro State Park

A cold pantry kept food stocks that did not necessarily need to be kept refrigerated. Breads, butter, cheesecakes, eggs, pastries, and pie were the common food stocks kept in a cold pantry. Vegetables could be brought up from the root cellar in smaller amounts and stored in the cold pantry until ready to use.

=== Hoosier Cabinet ===
The Hoosier cabinet, which combines a kitchen work area and food storage cupboards, emerged in the late 19th century. They fell out of fashion in the 1940s in favor of built-in cabinets.

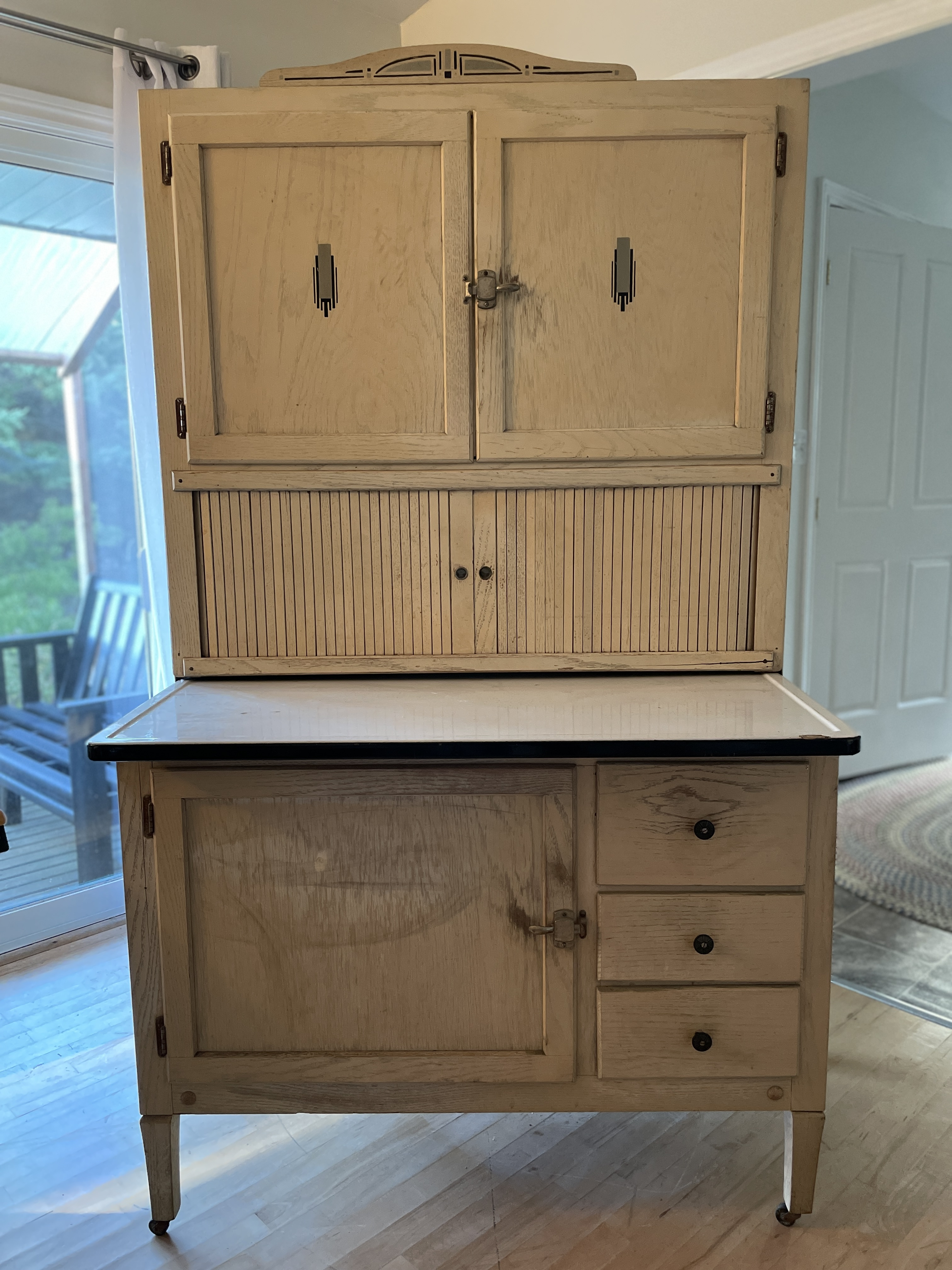
Hooiser cabinet

== Books ==
Literature from the late 19th and early 20th centuries often reflected the cultural and domestic importance of the pantry in household management. During the era of domestic science and home economics, instructional texts frequently included guidance on how to furnish, maintain, and utilize a pantry. In The American Woman’s Home (1869), Catharine E. Beecher and Harriet Beecher Stowe recommended eliminating the separate pantry by incorporating its shelving and cabinetry directly into the kitchen. While this design concept did not gain widespread adoption until the late 20th century, the traditional pantry remained a fixture in American homes for decades.

During the Victorian era and continuing until World War II, pantries were common in most American households. This was largely due to the utilitarian nature of kitchens at the time, which were typically small and separated from other living spaces. As a result, pantries served as essential auxiliary work areas, featuring built-in shelving, cabinetry, and countertops for food preparation and storage.

In literature, pantries occasionally appear as significant domestic spaces. In the final chapter of These Happy Golden Years, Laura Ingalls Wilder provides a detailed description of the pantry built by Almanzo Wilder in their first home in De Smet, South Dakota, portraying its role in daily life on a late 19th-century homestead.

Pantry raids were often common themes in children's literature and early 20th century advertising. Perhaps the most famous pantry incident in literature was when Mark Twain's Tom Sawyer had to do penance for getting into his Aunt Polly's jam in her pantry: as punishment, he had to whitewash her fence.

== See also ==
- Shaker-style pantry box
- Storage room
- Scullery
