= Fire room =

(Boiler room)

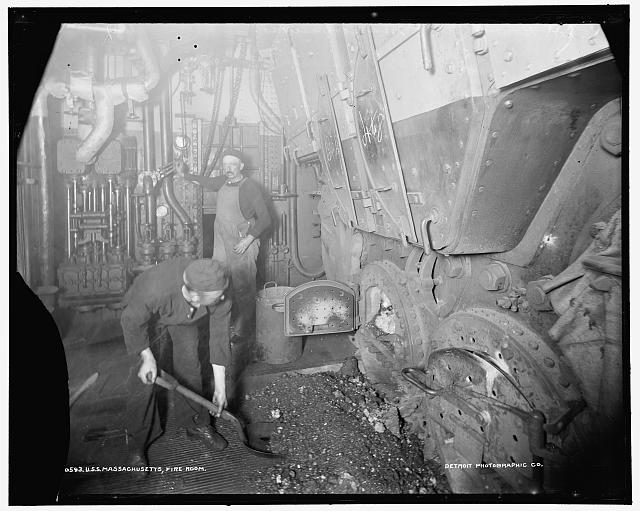
The fire room of the battleship USS Massachusetts

On a ship, the fire room, or FR or boiler room or stokehold was the space, or spaces, of a vessel where water was brought to a boil. The steam was then transmitted to a separate engine room, often (but not always) located immediately aft, where it was utilized to power the vessel. To increase the safety and damage survivability of a vessel, the machinery necessary for operations may be segregated into various spaces, the fire room was one of these spaces, and was among the largest physical compartments of the machinery space. On some ships, the space comprised more than one fire room, such as forward and aft, or port or starboard fire rooms, or may be simply numbered. Each room was connected to a flue, exhausting into a stack ventilating smoke.

By their nature, fire rooms were less complex than their allied engine room and were normally supervised by less senior personnel.

On a large percentage of vessels, ships and boats, the fire room was located near the bottom, and at the rear, or aft, end of the vessel, and usually comprised few compartments. This design maximized the cargo carrying capacity of the vessel. The fire room on some ships was situated amid-ships, especially on vessels built from the 1880s to the 1990s.

== Equipment ==
Vessels typically contained several engines for different purposes. Main, or propulsion engines are used to turn the ship's propeller and move the ship through the water. The fire room got its name from the days when ships burned coal to heat steam to drive the steam engines or turbines; the room was where the stokers spent their days shoveling coal continuously onto the grates under the boiler; poor men could sometimes pay for a trip across the Atlantic by signing on to work as a stoker for a one way trip, laboring in exchange for a temporary place on the crew. Later heavy fuel oil came into use, first combined with coal, then alone, as the petroleum industry developed, and the cleaner, easier to transport, load and burn liquid was found to be far superior once the appropriate logistical network was set up. With coal power, there was a mechanism for removing ash from the grates, as they would build up rapidly over time (the lighter fly ash would be drawn up the stack with the smoke).

On a steamship, power for both electricity and propulsion is provided by one or more large boilers giving rise to the alternate name boiler room. The latter name was preferred in the British Navy, among others. High pressure steam from the boiler is piped to the engine room to drive reciprocating engines or turbines for propulsion, and turbo generators for electricity. When cruising, it was normal for a naval vessel to damp the fires on up to two-thirds of their boilers, and use the steam from only a few boilers in one or two fire rooms to power the engines at low power. When higher speeds were required, more boilers would be brought on line (they were rarely extinguished entirely, as re-lighting a boiler was time-consuming). In rare occasions, when flank speed was called for, all boilers would be burning at once, generating a great deal of steam for high-speed operation, but at a very inefficient rate of coal consumption. Merchant vessels had much less need for high speed, so they would generally be satisfied with far fewer boilers, and much lower maximum speeds (and even then they would often save on fuel by not using all of the boilers, and traveling at a sedate 4–5 knots).

Naval ships typically were able to generate a large volume of smoke by changing the fuel mix. Prior to the heavy use of radar, a smoke screen could be used to mask the movement of ships (although smoke screens produced by smoke generators were also used). Coal in particular produced a large amount of black smoke, depending on the grade of coal; generally, the smallest amount of smoke was the most desirable, as it made the vessel harder to spot on the horizon.

== Damage control ==
Damage control was enhanced by the separation of the fire and engine rooms. In the event of damage to its associated engine room, steam could be transmitted to another engine room. In turn, an engine room could still operate though its associated fire room had become inoperative.

Two engineering advances resulted in the disappearance of the fire room in the early 1990s. The first was the movement by naval shipbuilding to nuclear-powered vessels. If a room containing nuclear material was subjected to damage, it was assumed that the event would likely result in abandonment of the ship regardless of the separation of rooms.

The second was the adoption of gas turbines in place of oil-fired boilers for all other navy ships. These powered engines directly and needed no boilers.

== Safety ==
=== Fire precautions ===
Fire rooms were hot, most often very dirty, and potentially dangerous. The presence of flammable fuel meant that a fire hazard existed in the fire room, which was monitored continuously by the ship's engineering staff and various monitoring systems.

=== Ventilation ===
Fire rooms employed some means of providing air for the operation of the flame to ignite the oil and associated ventilation. Only spot ventilation was practical to keep personnel cool. This would require an unrestricted hull opening of the same size as the intake area of the engine itself assuming the hull opening is in the fire room itself.

Forced draft fire rooms were used until World War II. These required that personnel enter through an air lock to maintain the pressure. These were abandoned when the forced draft occasionally failed and blowback occurred killing fire room personnel.

Commonly, screens were placed over openings reducing airflow by approximately 50% so the opening area was increased appropriately. The requirement for general ventilation and the requirement for sufficient combustion air are quite different. A typical arrangement might be to make the opening large enough to provide intake air plus 1,000 cubic feet (28 m^{3}) per Minute (CFM) for additional ventilation. Engines pull sufficient air into the fire room for their own operation. However, additional airflow for ventilation usually requires intake and exhaust blowers.

== Staffing requirements ==
When fired up, there were personnel assignments specified underway, as well as in port. For example, for an Iowa-class battleship, in normal steaming four boilers were operated. This was sufficient to power the ships at speeds up to 27 knots (50 km/h). For higher speeds, all eight boilers were lit. Each operating boiler required a minimum of four trained operators on watch: a boiler supervisor (BTOW), a superheater burnerman and saturated burnerman to control the steam temperature and pressure and a checkman, who monitored and controlled the water level in the steam drum. In addition, there was a fireroom messenger and a lower level pumpman on duty whenever the fireroom was steaming.

== See also ==
- Kearny incident
- Engineering department
- Marine propulsion
- Marine fuel management
- Mechanical room
- Electrical room
