= California cooler =

California cooler may refer to:

- California cooler (cabinet)
- Cold pantry
- California Cooler, a brand of alcoholic beverages
