= Cable box =

Cable box may refer to:

- Cable box (electronics) an electronic device that controls cable television in individual homes
- Cable box (outside) a box located outside a residence that connects cable television
- The Time Warner Cable Arena in Charlotte, North Carolina is sometimes colloquially referred to as the "cable box."
- the television set-top box is sometimes referred to as a cable box
