= Utility vault =

Area for public utility access

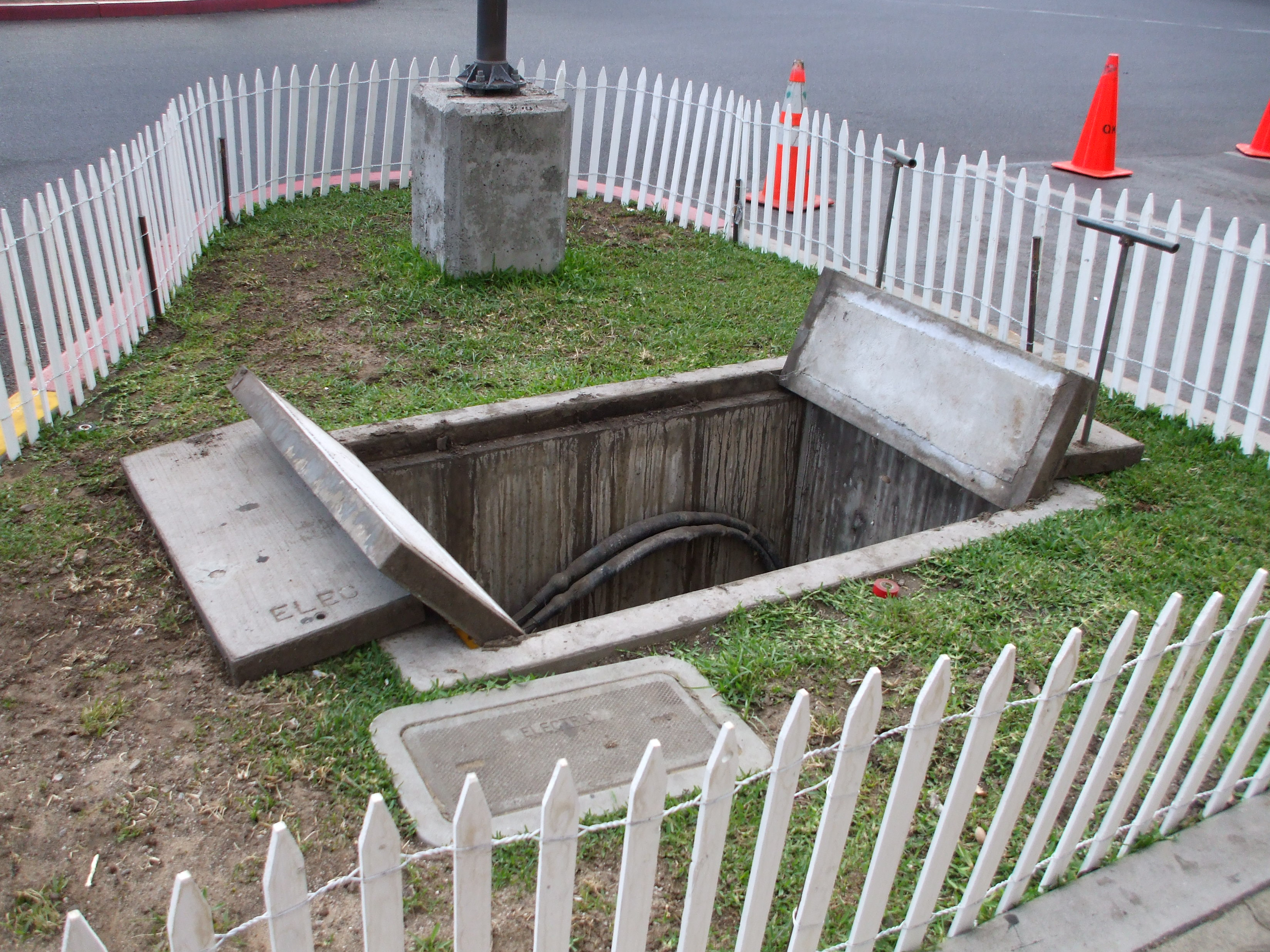
An open utility vault. "ELEC" on cover indicates electrical equipment/wires.

A utility vault is an underground room providing access to subterranean public utility equipment, such as valves for water or natural gas pipes, or switchgear for electrical or telecommunications equipment. A vault is often accessible directly from a street, sidewalk or other outdoor space, thereby distinct from a basement of a building.

Utility vaults are commonly constructed out of reinforced concrete boxes, poured concrete or brick. Small ones are usually entered through a manhole or grate on the topside and closed up by a manhole cover. Such vaults are considered confined spaces and can be hazardous to enter. Large utility vaults are similar to mechanical or electrical rooms in design and content.

== See also ==
- Dartford Cable Tunnel
- Telecommunications pedestal
- Utility cut
- Utility tunnel
