= Bonus room =

Room in a house not meeting building codes

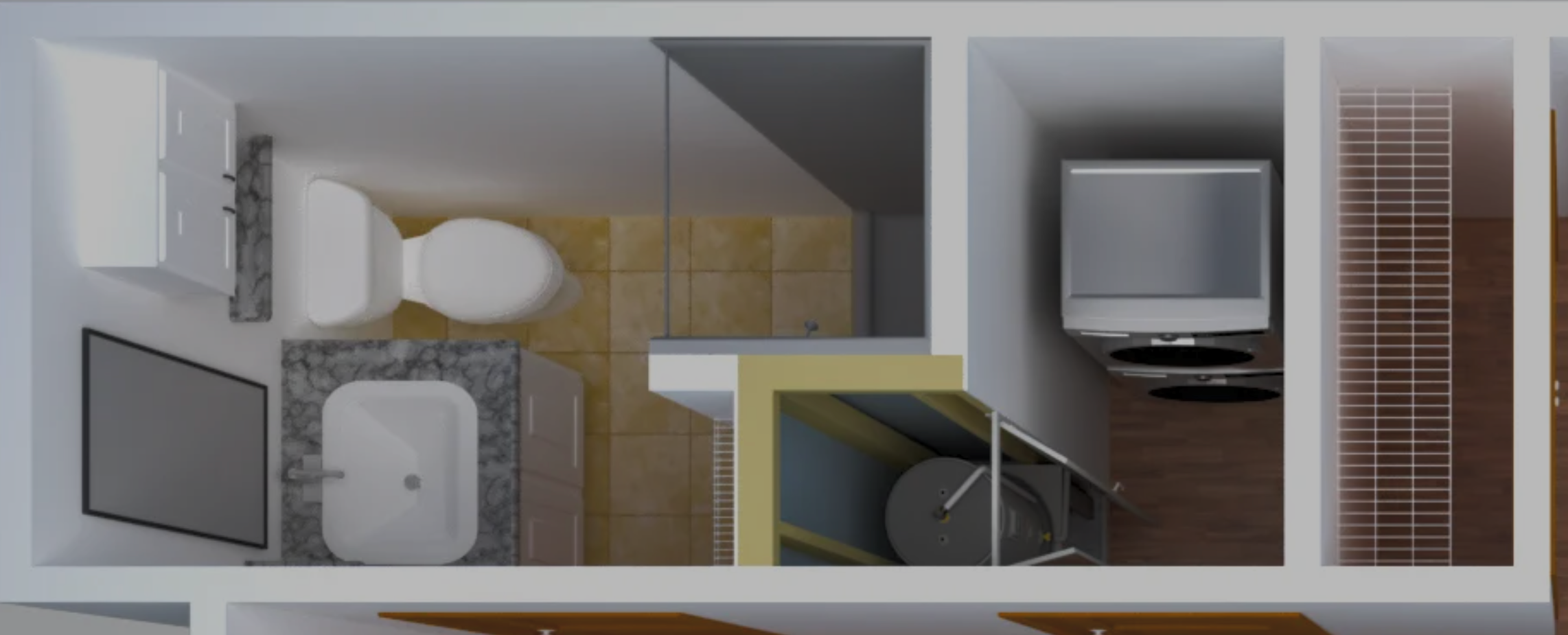
Bathrooms, technical rooms, laundry rooms or storage rooms/wardrobes do not typically satisfy requirements for permanent residence according to building codes

A bonus room, flex room, multiuse room or spare room (though the latter often means an extra bedroom) is a room created by remodeling or adding an addition that does not meet local building code definitions for traditional rooms, or is designed for multiple possible uses. For example, codes will typically require that a bedroom have a window and a certain number of electrical outlets. Such a room might actually be intended for sleeping, but will be described as a "bonus room" in rental and sales listings.

== Etymology ==
The term bonus room is mainly used in the United States. One early use is from The New York Times in 1991, which wrote that "A recent solution to the problem of noisy teen-agers is the enticingly titled bonus room, which is a spare room on the bedroom floor that can be used as a den, television room or guest room."

== Modern evolution ==
The concept of a bonus room has evolved significantly in recent years. Initially, bonus rooms were used to address noise or activity clashes in open floor plans, such as providing space for teenagers’ music or family entertainment. More recently, the term has become a popular architectural design trend. One article notes that while bonus rooms were originally found on the bedroom floor, they are now frequently built over garages, in attics, or in basements.
