= Equipment room =

Room for mechanical or electrical equipment

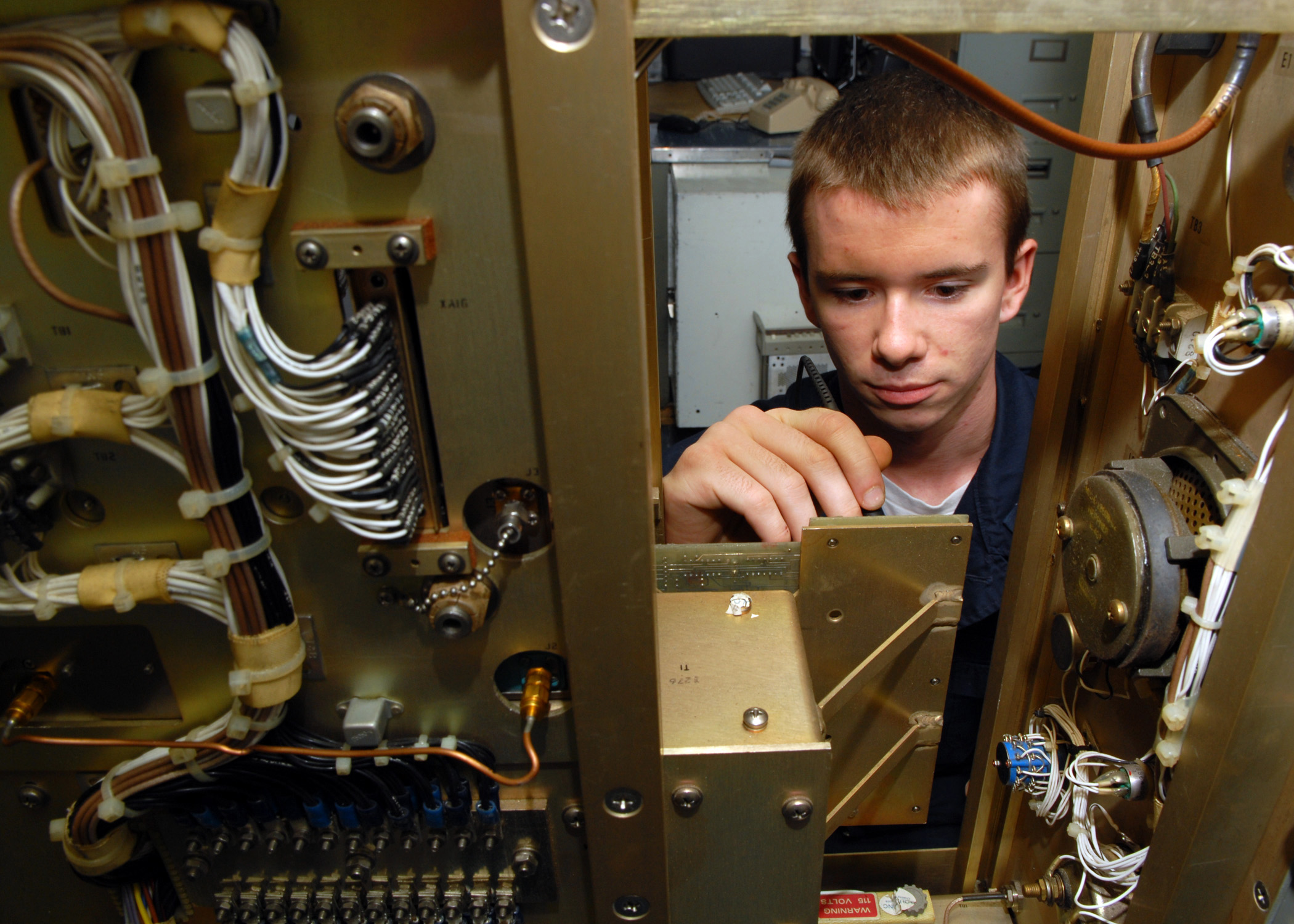
An electronics technician performing voltage checks in an air navigation equipment room aboard the aircraft carrier USS Abraham Lincoln

A technical room or equipment room is a room where technical equipment has been installed, for example for controlling a building's climate, electricity, water and wastewater. The equipment can include electric panels, central heating, heat network, machinery for ventilation systems, air conditioning, various types of pumps and boilers, as well as telecommunications equipment. It can serve one or more housing units or buildings.

Technical rooms are very important for the stable operation of buildings, and should be designed so that one has plenty of space to work on the technical equipment during repairs and maintenance. In homes, technical rooms may not satisfy the building code standards set for traditional living spaces, and hence its floor area may not be classified as suited for permanent residence.

Some types of technical rooms are:

- Electrical room
- Mechanical room

== See also ==
- Central apparatus room
- Data center
- Server room
- Wiring closet
- Storage room
- Utility room
