= Telecommunications pedestal =

Small structure housing connection points for underground cables

A telecommunications pedestal is a ground-level housing for a passive connection point for underground cables. Technicians require access to connection points. Placing such a point underground (e.g., in a utility vault) is expensive, so pedestals are preferred when they are an acceptable choice. Pedestals are used for CATV (known as a cable box in such a situation), telephone, passive optical networks, and other telecommunications systems.

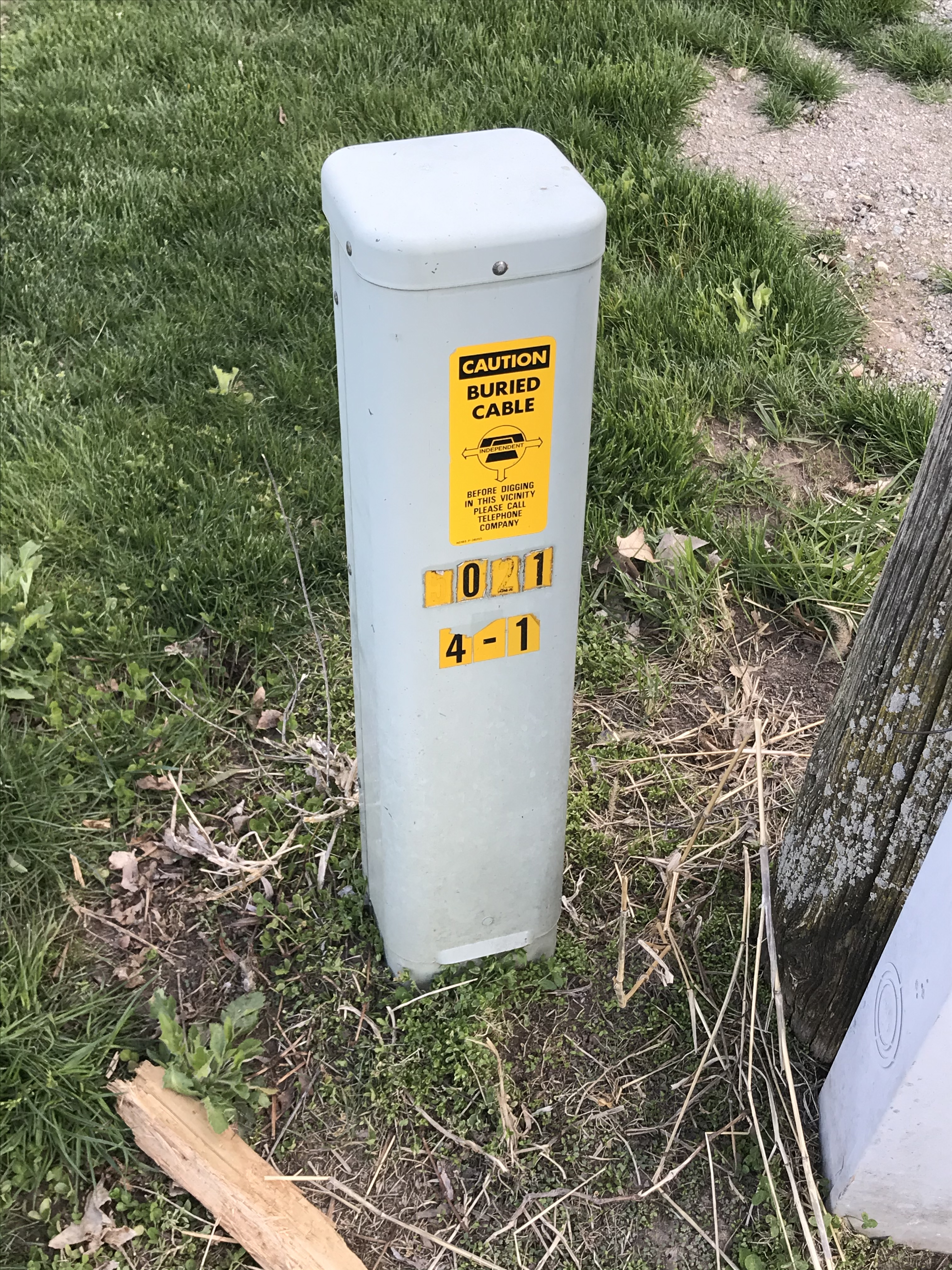
A telephone company's pedestal with wires running from the telephone company's exchange demarcation point and the other side of the connection goes to the network interface device on the customer's premise (their property wiring).

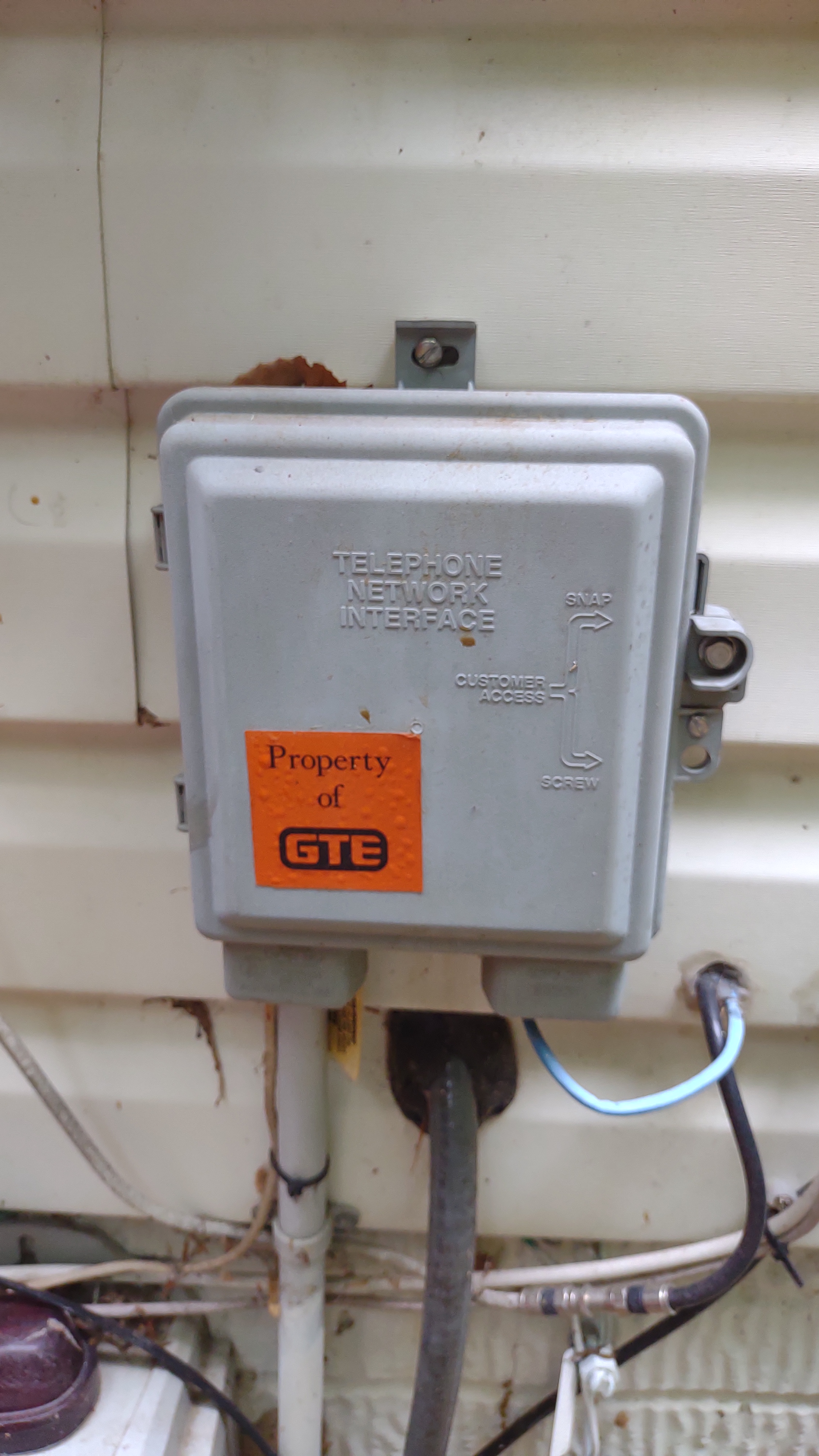
A TNI (telephone network interface) box mounted on the side of a building unit connect to the demarcation point of a telecommunications pedestal in the ground to the telephone company's exchange.

A pedestal is generally a sheet metal or plastic housing that encloses a passive termination block. The pedestal is usually about 3 feet high and has a diameter of less than one foot, with a circular, rectangular, oval, or "rounded rectangle" cross-section. The pedestal either has an access panel or removable housing. One, two, three or (occasionally) more underground distribution cables rise from the ground into the bottom of the pedestal and the individual circuits from the cables are terminated on the termination block. In addition to distribution cables, the pedestal may terminate one or more individual underground subscriber cables. The cables are cross-connected as needed at the termination block. A weather-proof one mounted on a building is connected to said telecommunications pedestal with a burial cable and wired into the box near or far from it to the telecommunication company's premise (their cable in and out center) to get the telecommunications service through the lines.
