= Mechanical room =

Space in a building dedicated to the mechanical equipment

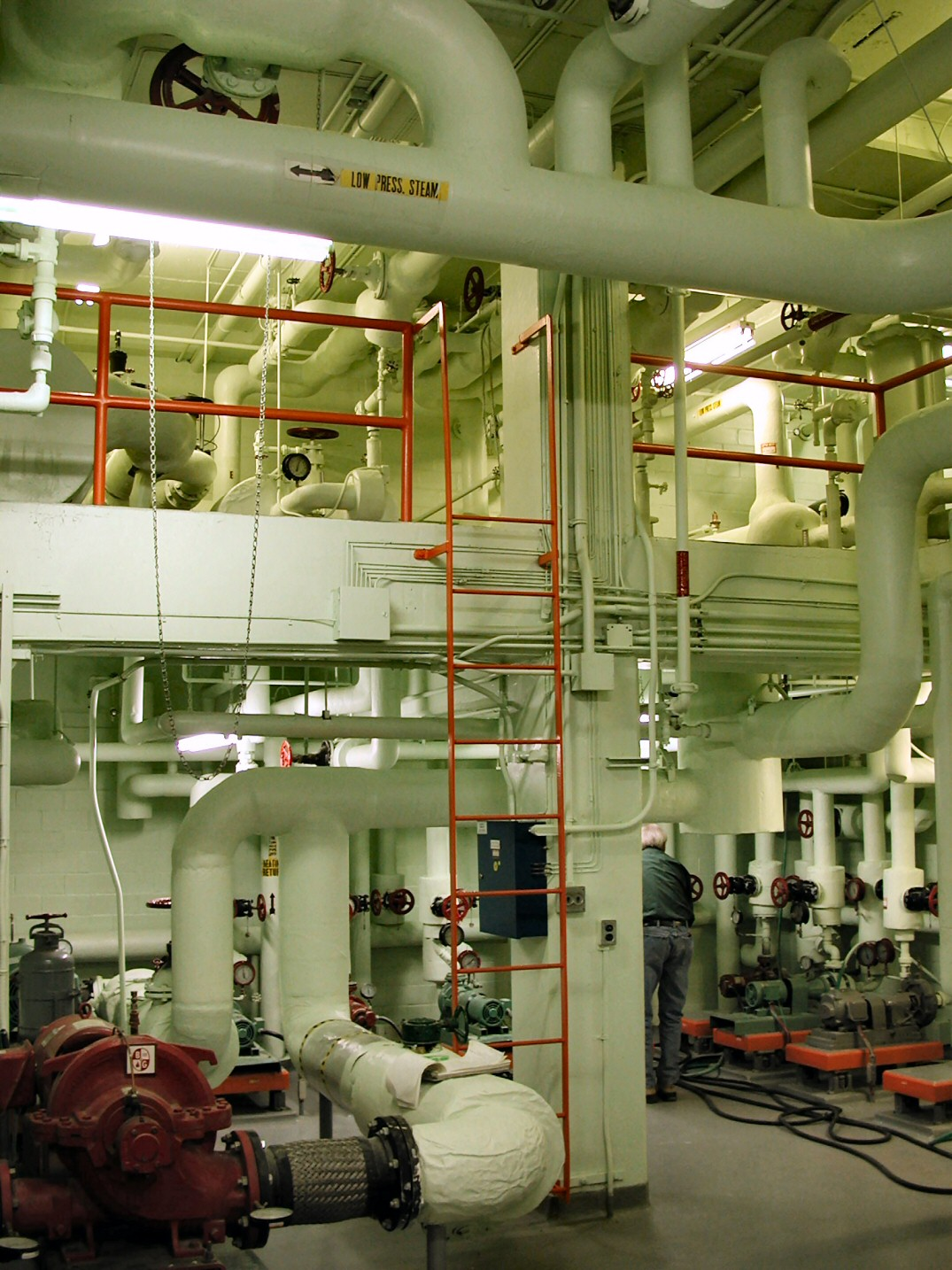
Mechanical room in a large office building.

Mechanical room in federal building, Los Angeles, California

A mechanical room, boiler room or plant room is a technical room or space in a building dedicated to the mechanical equipment and its associated electrical equipment, as opposed to rooms intended for human occupancy or storage. Unless a building is served by a centralized heating plant, the size of the mechanical room is usually proportional to the size of the building. A small building or home may have at most a utility room, but, in larger buildings, mechanical rooms can be of considerable size. They often require multiple rooms throughout the building, or even occupy one or more complete floors (see: mechanical floor).

Technical rooms in residential houses typically house technical equipment such as air handling units, central heating, electric panels or water heaters, or gives easy access to utilities such as a building's internal stop-tap for water supply, inspection holes for greywater or sewage lines.

== Equipment ==
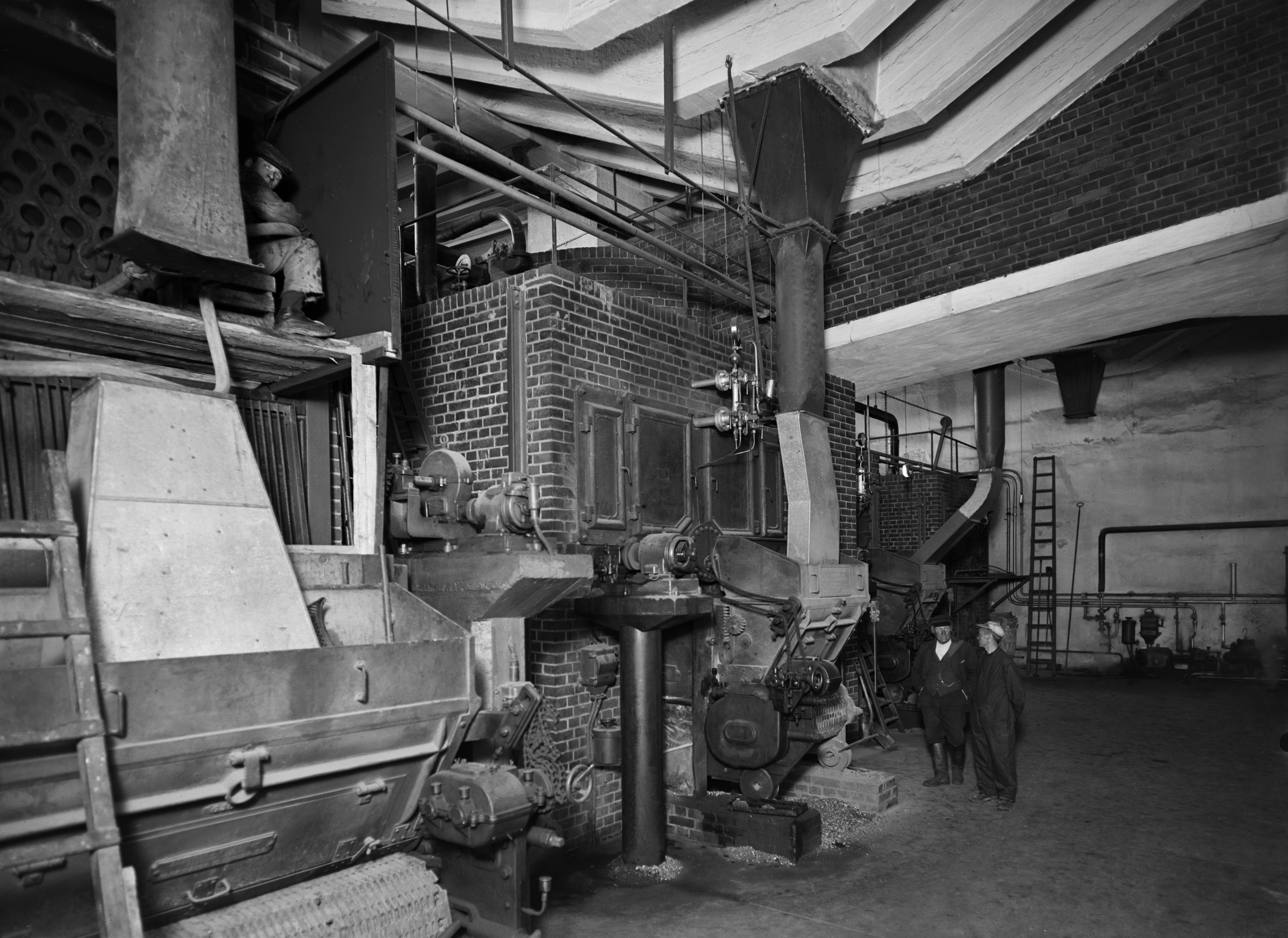
Elanto's old boiler room in Helsinki, Finland in September 1930

Mechanical systems and equipment that may be housed in a mechanical room include:

- Air handlers
- Boilers
- Chillers
- Heat exchangers
- Water heaters and tanks
- Water pumps (for domestic, heating/cooling, and firefighting water)
- Main distribution piping and valves
- Fire sprinkler distribution piping and pumps
- Back-up electrical generators
- Elevator machinery
- Back-up batteries
- Other HVAC (heating, ventilation and air-conditioning) equipment

Equipment in mechanical rooms is often operated and maintained by a stationary engineer or a maintenance technician. Modern buildings use building automation systems to manage HVAC cycles, lighting, communications, and life safety equipment. Often, the control system hardware is located in the mechanical room and monitored or accessed remotely.

Rooms with only electrical or electronic equipment are not considered mechanical rooms but are instead called electrical rooms.

== See also ==
- Noise pollution
- Engine room
- Electrical room
- Steamfitter
