= Grand Panetier =

Grand Panetier may refer to:

- Grand Panetier of Croatia, a title held by the House of Cseszneky (Cseszneky de Milvány et Csesznek)
- Grand Panetier of France, a title held by the Cossé de Brissac family
- Grand Panetier of Normandy, a dignity in the Duchy of Normandy, occasionally hereditary
