= Scullery =

Room in a house traditionally used for washing up dishes

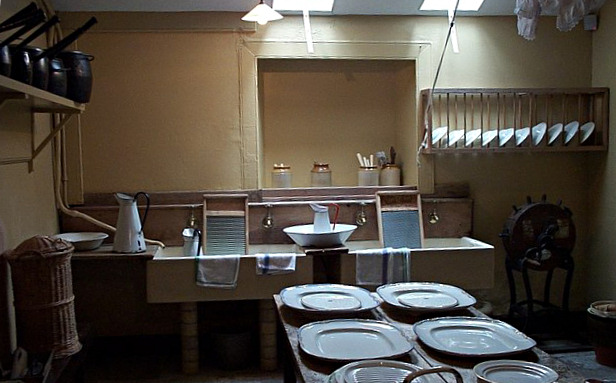
The scullery of Brodick Castle

A scullery is a room in a house, traditionally used for washing up dishes and laundering clothes, or as an overflow kitchen. Tasks performed in the scullery include cleaning dishes and cooking utensils (or storing them), occasional kitchen work, ironing, boiling water for cooking or bathing, and soaking and washing clothes. Sculleries contain hot and cold sinks, sometimes slop sinks, drain pipes, storage shelves, plate racks, a work table, various coppers for boiling water, tubs, and buckets.

The term "scullery" has fallen into disuse in North America, as laundry takes place in a utility room or laundry room.

The term continues in use in its original sense in Britain and Ireland amongst the middle classes, or as an alternative term for kitchen in some regions of Britain, typically Northern Ireland and Scotland, or in designer kitchens.

In military terminology and most commercial restaurants, a "scullery" refers to the section of a dining facility where pots and pans are scrubbed and rinsed (in an assembly line style). It is usually near the kitchen and the serving line.

== Etymology ==
According to the Merriam-Webster Online Dictionary, Middle English squilerie, sculerie, department of household in charge of dishes, from Anglo-French esquilerie, from escuele, eskel bowl, from Latin scutella, drinking bowl.

== The traditional household scullery ==
The scullery was a back kitchen located adjacent to the main kitchen, frequently to the rear of the house nearest the water supply, such as a public fountain or a well, or near a barrel that collected rain water, which was the preferred water for washing dishes. In houses built prior to indoor plumbing, scullery sinks were located against an outside wall. Since sculleries were used for washing and great quantities of water had to be carried inside, they were made with solid floors of brick, stone, terracotta tiles, or concrete. Although a drain, known as a soil pipe, would carry the dirty water outside of the house, the floors were likely to stay wet. The scullery maid, or person washing dishes at the sink, would stand on slatted wood mats near the sinks. The floor itself was often dug six inches or so (150mm) below the main house floor in case of leaks or flooding. In designing a scullery, architects would take care to place the room adjacent to the kitchen with a door leading directly outside to conveniently obtain water. However, for sanitation purposes (since so much slop was processed in the scullery), no doors led from there to the pantry or store rooms.

Scullery sinks came in pairs, one for hot water and the other for cold water. They were square or rectangular in shape, shallow, and made of non-absorbent materials, such as the slate sinks at Chawton House or lined with copper to protect delicate dishes.

Per the 1891 instruction manual, Principles and Practice of Plumbing:

The general sink in the scullery, into which all kinds of liquids and matter are emptied, from green-water to greasy matters, should be made of a non-absorbent material, such as stoneware or fire-clay. Or if the sink is to answer the double purpose of receiver and washer, i.e., if instead of washing the dinner-plates, etc., in a tub placed within the sink, the sink itself is to be used for that purpose, then instead of fixing a sink of non-elastic material, as stoneware or fire-clay, a wood sink lined with tinned copper should be fixed, copper being sufficiently elastic to prevent the breakage of crockery ware, and its surface being smoother and therefore cleaner than lead.

In addition to washing dishes and preparing foods for roasting and boiling, such as cleaning vegetables and dressing poultry, game, and fish; the scullery was used for boiling water and doing laundry, which necessitated the following equipment:

- Set pot (the "copper" or a big metal tub): boiling water
- Dolly tub: soaking dirty clothes overnight
- Wooden tub: for scrubbing
- Mangle: For squeezing water out of cloth

Sanitation was a special concern for house owners, whose sculleries could be the source of illness if they were not properly drained or kept clean. Grease, which abounded in scullery sink water, could choke up a soil pipe and start stinking up the house (see fatberg). Water from green vegetables also has a peculiarly objectionable smell; thus, drainage was of the utmost importance. "The most generally recommended arrangement for carrying away scullery sink water is to make the pipe pass through the scullery wall terminating a little above the ground and to discharge its contents into an open drain from which it is conducted by a pipe into the drain leading to the sewer." In the late 19th century, unsanitary conditions in sculleries and privies could lead to frequent bouts of infectious illness among the home's occupants. A writer in an 1898 edition of the medical journal The Lancet, observed:

A private house in this neighbourhood, rented at 4 a week, was pointed out to me because its inmates had suffered a good deal of sickness, scarlet fever, measles, etc. Here in the back yard, measuring about 10 ft by 5 ft, I found that the privy was only separated from the scullery by a wall four and a half inches thick and that it stood nine inches higher than the scullery floor. By the privy and forming part of it was an open ashpit full of disgusting filth. The rain keeps this filth in a constant state of moisture, so that the excremental matter percolates through the rotting wall of the scullery, and yet against this wall, there are shelves where cooking utensils are placed. On the morning of my visit, some potatoes, ready peeled for cooking, were piled up against that part of the wall which was permeated with the moisture from the privy. When it rains, the amount of water coming through the wall from the privy and into the scullery is much greater, and the scullery is only separated from the living room by a door which generally remains open.

== Hospital sculleries ==
For maximum sanitation, the 19th century English nurse, Florence Nightingale, recommended that porcelain sinks should be used in sculleries attached to hospital wards. "The best sink for a scullery is the new white porcelain sink recently introduced with hot and cold water laid on. Care must be taken that the waste pipe has no direct communication with a closed drain, otherwise foul air is certain to find its way into the hospital."
