= Storage room =

Room for storing objects

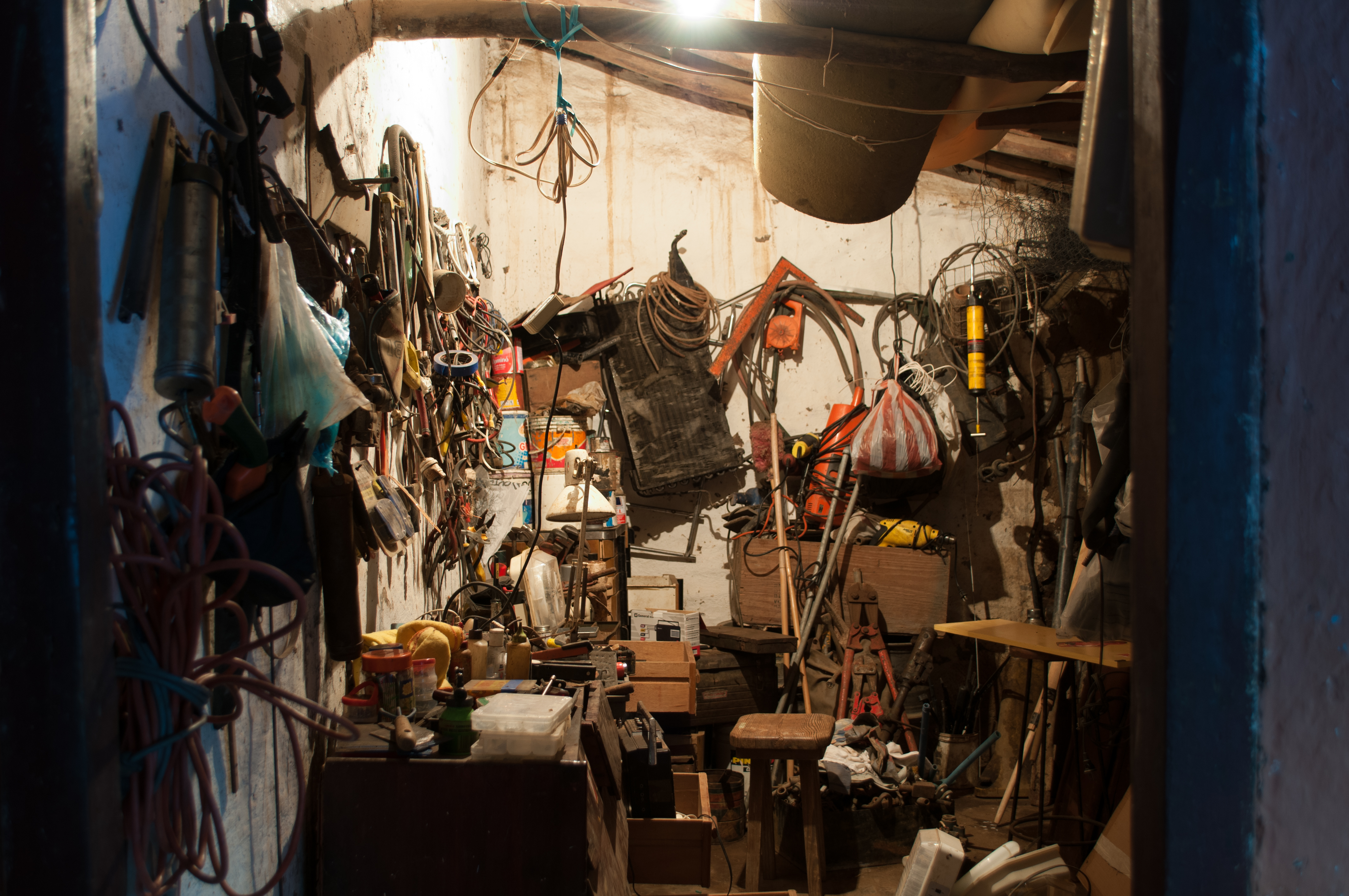
A messy and dark storeroom

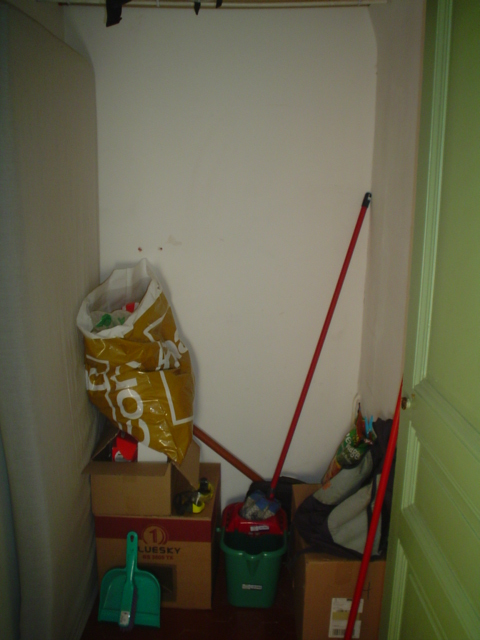
A classical janitor's closet, with things left to chance

A storage room or storeroom is a room in a building for storing objects. They are not designed for permanent residence, and are often small and without windows. Such rooms often have more lenient requirements for fire protection, daylight entry and emergency exits compared to rooms intended for permanent residence.

In businesses, the storage is a place where the employees can put their goods and then take them out when the store starts to become empty or when there is a high demand.

In dwelling, storage rooms are used to store less used tools or items that are not used on a daily basis. The term shed is often used for separate small independent buildings for storing food, equipment and the like, for example storage sheds, toolsheds or woodsheds. Historically, storage rooms in homes have often been narrow, dark and inconspicuous, and places on floors other than the main floors of the building, such as in a basement or an attic.

A storage room can be lockable, and can be located in a housing unit or a common area, indoors or outdoors.

== Rental of storage ==
There are companies that rent out storage space for self storage, where individuals and companies can rent storage rooms.

== Television programs ==
Sheds, garages and other storage rooms can become overcrowded and cluttered with items that are not in use, or old scrap that has neither been thrown away nor repaired yet, things that one is unable to get rid of or have big plans for. The value of the mess is often small, especially if the people who live there have a compulsive hoarding problem and if the objects are stored in such a way that the condition becomes very poor. The TV show Hoarders is one of several TV shows that try to help people with such problems.

In some cases, there may be valuable antiques that have been stored and forgotten. The TV program American Pickers is a show where the hosts go through old collections in search of valuable antiques.

Storage Wars is a TV series where the contents of storage lockers are auctioned off to customers who hasn't paid their rent, without the bidders being allowed to enter and have a close look on what is inside except for a quick peek from the outside.

== See also ==
- Garage (residential), a storage area usually used to store cars
- Manual handling of loads
- Overhead storage
- Pantry
- Technical room
- Utility room
- Warehouse, a building used to store goods
- Wine room
