= Utility room =

Room in a house where laundry is done

A utility room is a room where equipment not used in day-to-day activities is kept. "Utility" refers to an item which is designed for usefulness or practical use, so in turn most of the items kept in this room have functional attributes. A utility room is generally the area where laundry is done, and is the descendant of the scullery.

Utility room is more commonly used in British English, while North American English generally refer to this room as a laundry room, except in the American Southeast. In Australian English laundry is the usual term.

== Uses ==
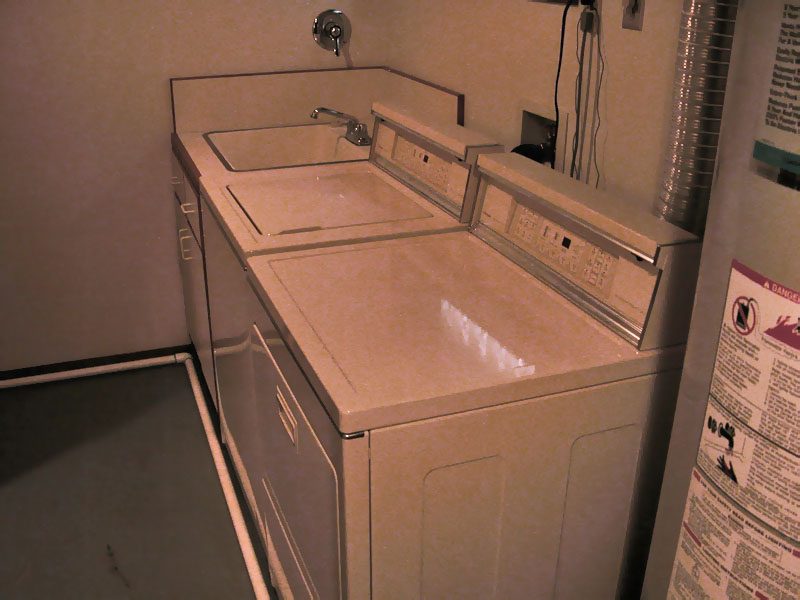
Laundry equipment within a room

The utility room has several uses but typically functions as an area to do laundry. This room contains laundry equipment such as a washing machine, tumble dryer, ironing boards and clothes iron. The room is also used for closet organization and storage. The room would normally contain a second coat closet which is used to store seasonal clothing such as winter coats or clothing which are no longer used daily. Storage spaces would contain other appliances which would generally be in the kitchen if it was in usage daily. Furnaces and the water heater are sometime incorporated to the room as well. Shelving and trash may sometimes be seen at this area as not to congest the other parts of the house.

== History ==
The utility room is a modern descendant of the scullery where important kitchen items were kept during its usage in England. The term was further defined around the 14th century as a household department where kitchen items are taken care of. The term utility room was mentioned in 1760, when a cottage was built in a rural location in the United Kingdom that was accessible through Penarth and Cardiff. A utility room for general purposes also depicted its use as a guest room in case of an immediate need. A 1944 Scottish housing and planning report recommended that new state-built homes for families could provide a utility room as a general-purpose workroom for washing clothes, cleaning boots and jobbing repairs. An American publication, the Pittsburgh Post-Gazette, on July 24, 1949 reported that utility rooms had become more popular than basements in new constructions. On June 28, 1959, in a report of a typical American house being built in Moscow, Russia, the house was described to have a utility room immediately at the right side after the entrance. The Chicago Tribune reported that the laundry room was then commonly being referred to as the utility room in a September 30, 1970, publication.

== See also ==
- Furnace room
- Mechanical room
- Root cellar
- Scullery
- Storage room
- Technical room
