= Cable box (outside) =

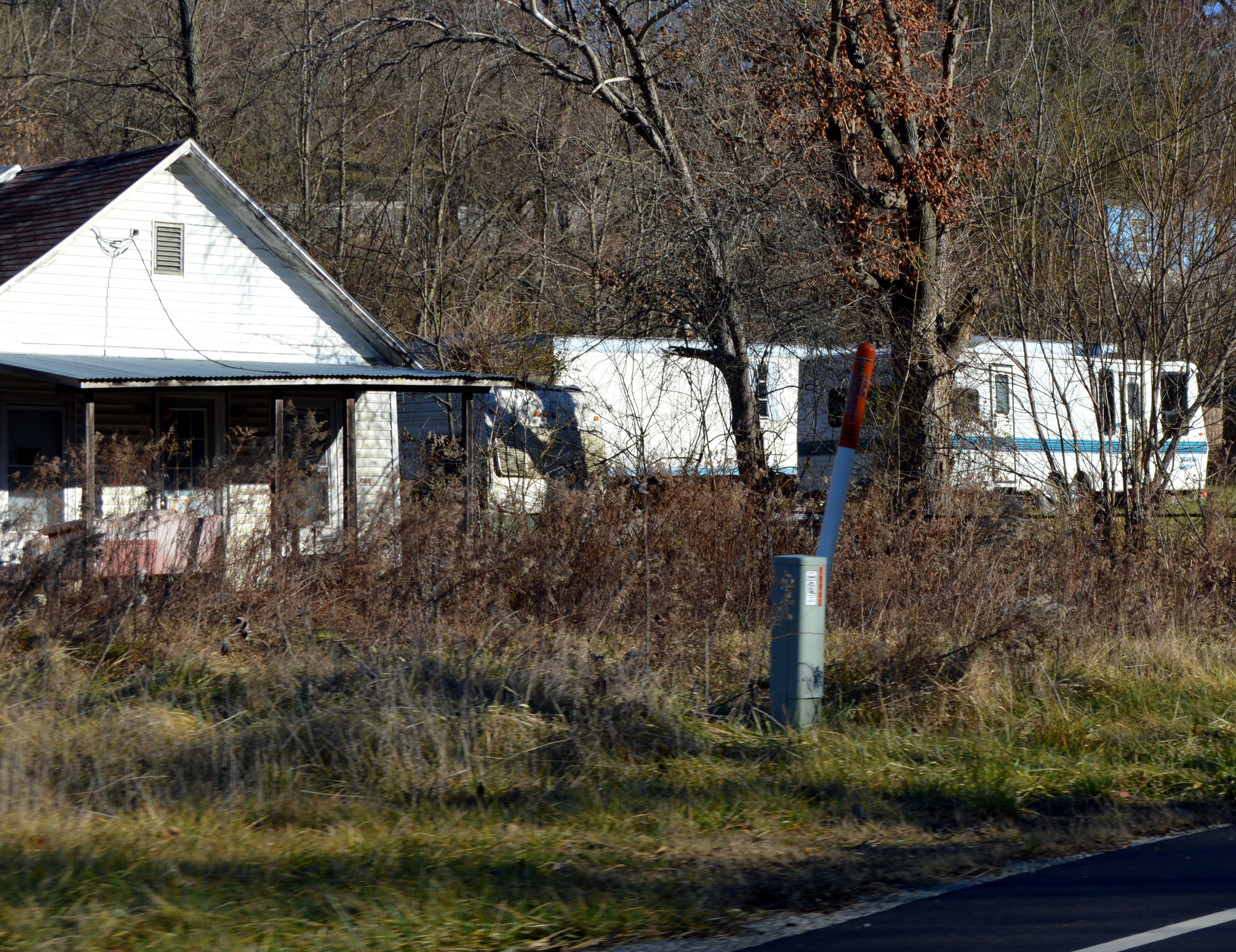
A cable box sits on the roadside in front of a house

A cable box is a metal enclosure (found in the vicinity of a house that has cable service) that connects a house or building to the cable provider. The box is usually located near the connection points for other service connections (electric or telephone). Other locations of the cable box include centralized locations (apartment buildings), lawns, or telephone poles. This feature serves as the demarcation point in which the provider's responsibility ends and the customer's responsibility (cabling and connections) begins.

== Purpose ==
Cable boxes direct cable service to the cable wiring inside the house or building being serviced. To control which channels are available to the subscriber, service providers may place analog filters at the transmitting or receiving end, a method once popular in the '90s although now less common. Digital cable providers now use digital methods to control the availability of channels.

== See also ==
- Junction box
- Digital television
- Digital cable
- Power box
- Telecommunications pedestal
