= California cooler (cabinet) =

Interior cabinet to cool and store food items

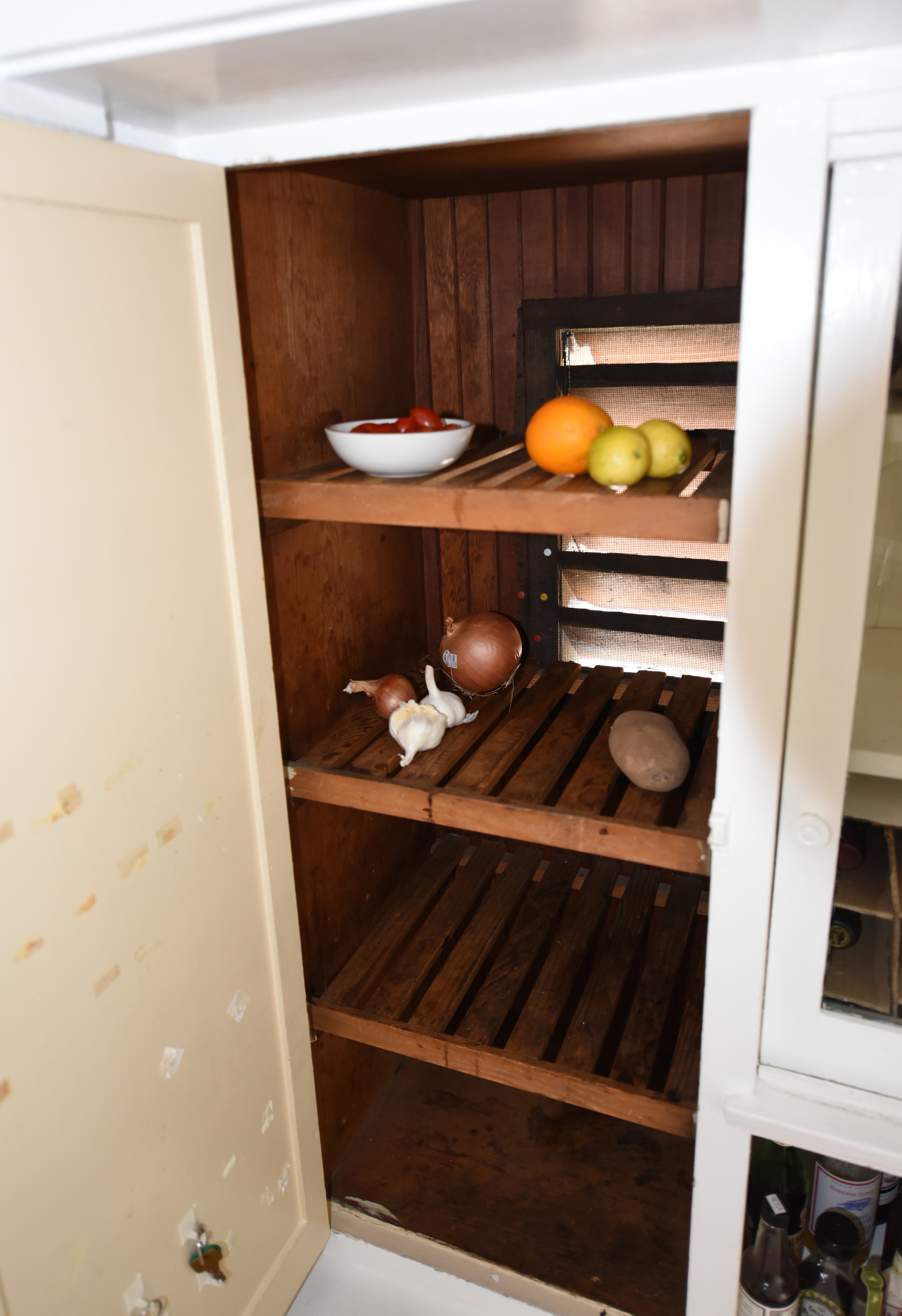
Interior of a California cooler with fruits and vegetables on the shelves.

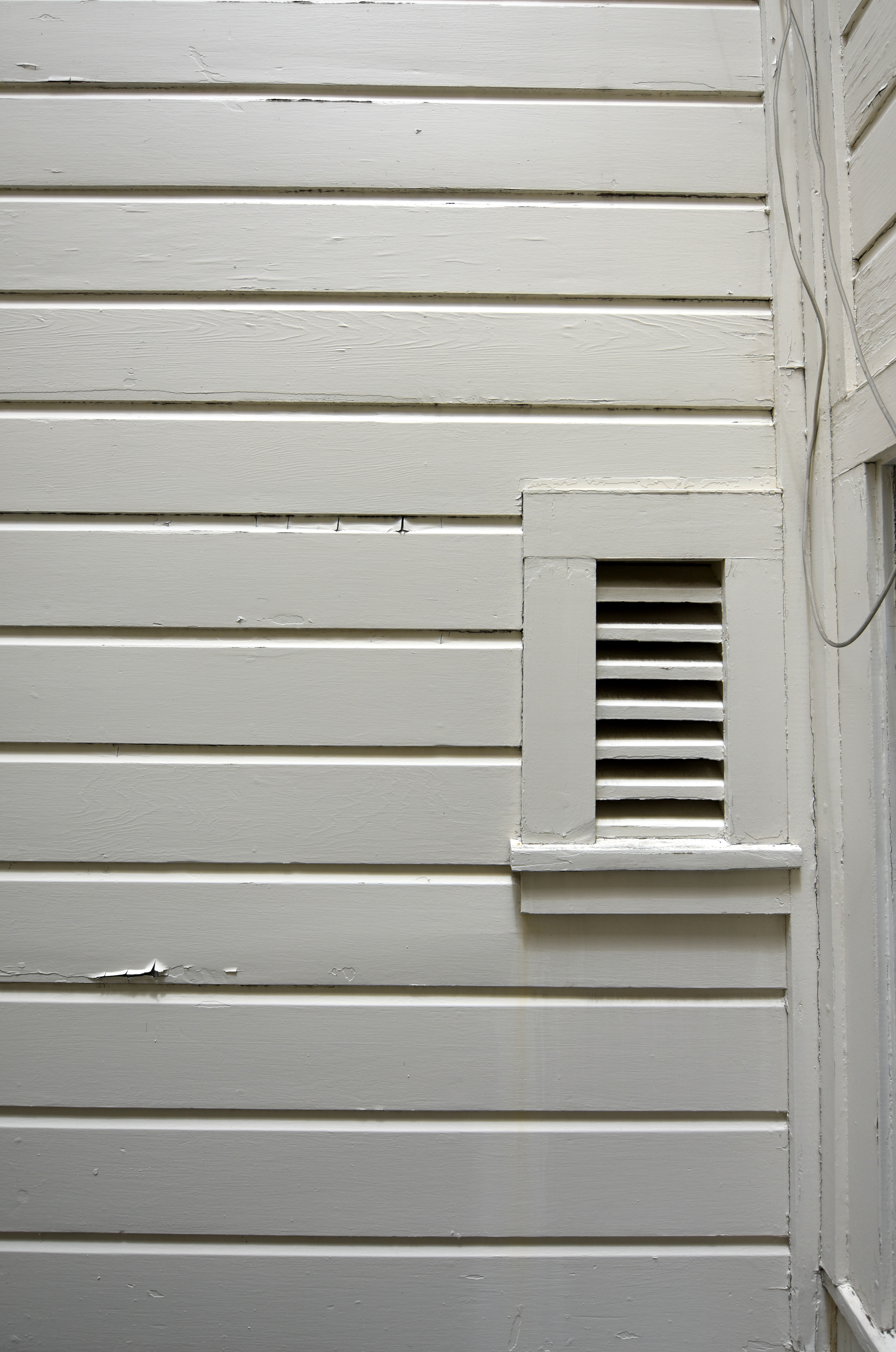
Exterior vent of a California cooler

A California cooler, also known as a cooler cabinet, is a type of cabinet used for the cool storage of food items that was popular in the western United States in the late 19th and early 20th centuries.

== Construction ==
The California cooler is constructed simply as an interior cabinet with slatted or screened shelves. Vents near the top and bottom allow outside air to circulate by the principle of natural convection. This results in convective cooling, which keeps perishable food items fresh. The outside vents are separated from the outside by a screen, preventing the incursion of insects, and downward slanting slats shut out rain. Often on a wall away from sun, they tend to be located near where food is prepared, such as in the kitchen. Modifications to work in more variable climates, such as a trap door to selectively draw air from a cellar, are possible.

== Usage ==
These coolers are most commonly found on the west coast of the United States because they function particularly well in temperate climates. They are commonplace in west coast bungalows. Elsewhere in the United States other strategies were used for cool storage of food items. Cellars were used in the Midwest, and larders were commonplace on the east coast.

Fruits and vegetables would be placed directly on the slatted shelves to encourage airflow around them. Items such as milk bottles could be stored wrapped in a wet cloth. The rapid evaporation to the moving air could keep the milk sufficiently cool.

Prior to the widespread usage of home refrigeration, iceboxes were used for the cool storage of food items. The California cooler could be used to free up valuable space in the ice box by storing items that did not require as much refrigeration. Even after electric refrigeration came into play, they continued to be used to provide additional cool storage. After the advent of refrigerants such as Freon in the 1930s, California coolers, along with ice boxes, waned in popularity.

== Adaptations ==
Although some California coolers have been preserved, often they remain with vents to outside blocked off and are used as general storage. Many modern designers have completely removed the cabinets in renovations; however, some have replaced the exterior vents with windows to bring light into the area, or even occasionally provide an opening for a cat door.
