= Electrical room =

Building room for electrical equipment

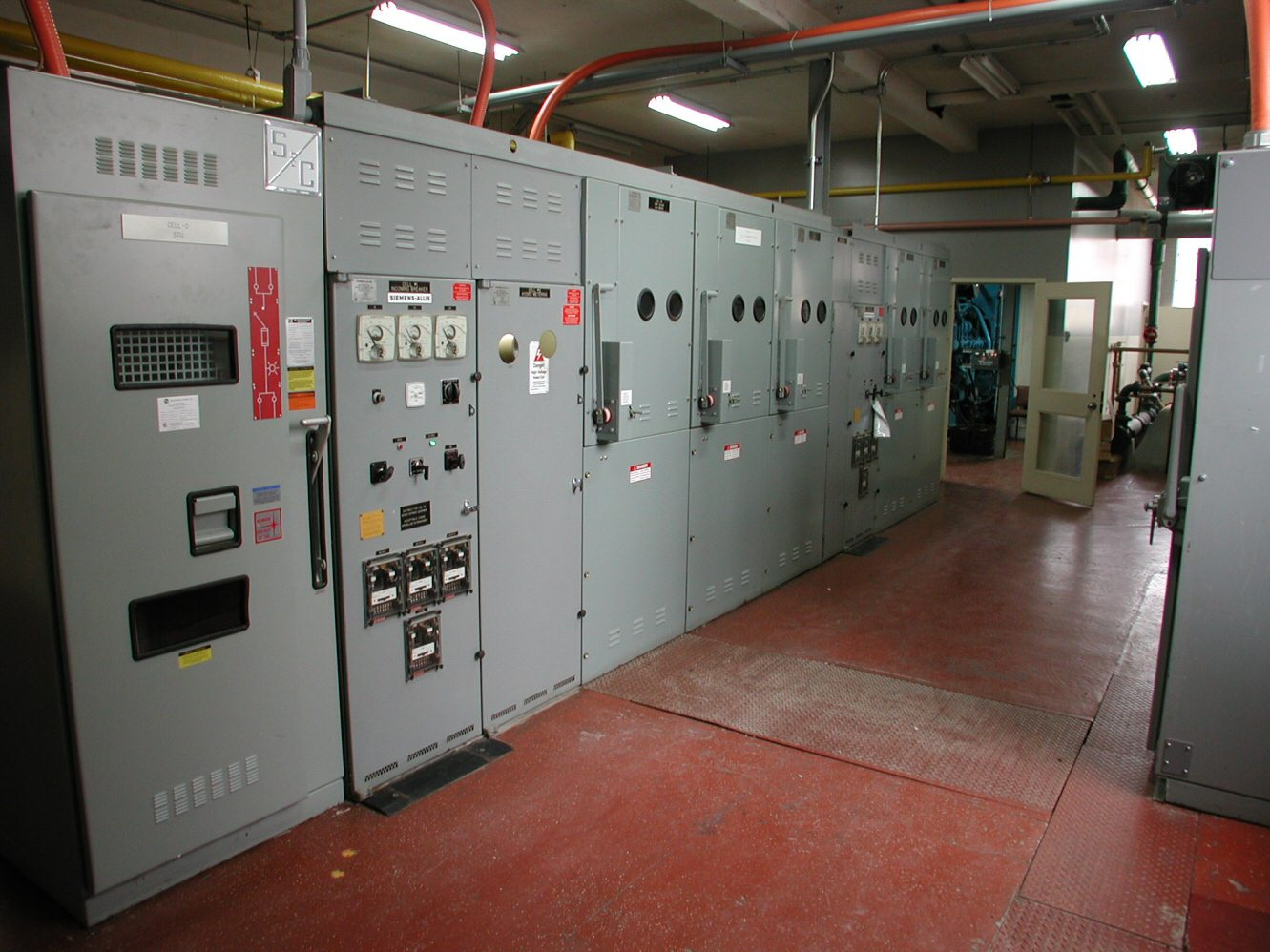
Main electrical distribution room in a large building.

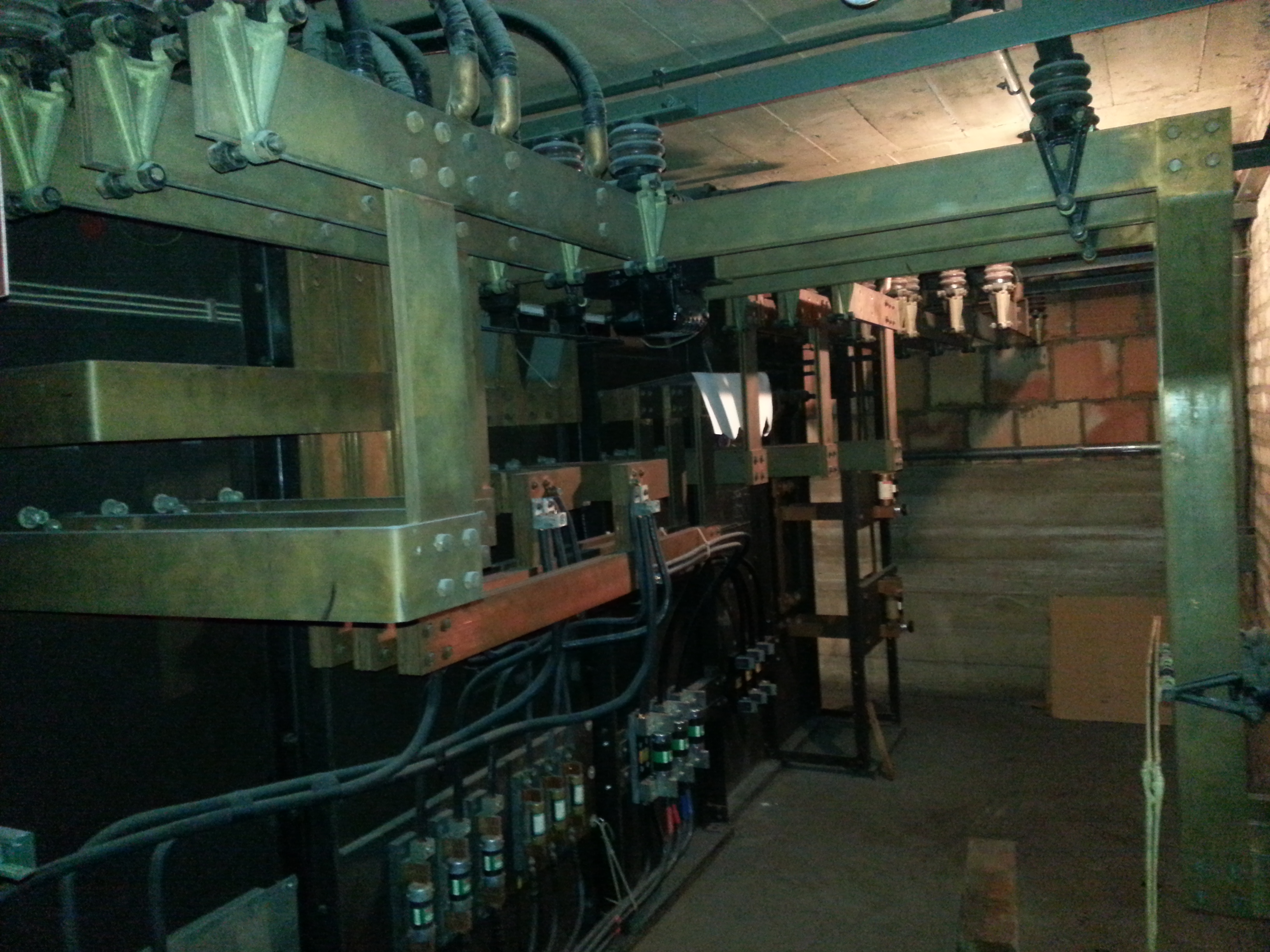
The back of an antique electrical room, still operational at a US plant as of 2014. All conducting busbars are open and operators must be careful not to touch them.

An electrical room is a technical room or space in a building dedicated to electrical equipment. Its size is usually proportional to the size of the building; large buildings may have a main electrical room and subsidiary electrical rooms. Electrical equipment may be for power distribution equipment, or for communications equipment.

Electrical rooms typically house the following equipment:

- Electric switchboards
- Distribution boards
- Circuit breakers and disconnects
- Motor control centers
- Transformers
- Busbars
- Electricity meters
- Backup batteries in a Battery room
- Fire alarm control panels
- Distribution frames

In large building complexes, the primary electrical room may house an indoor electrical substation.

== Construction features ==
The construction features of an electrical room vary depending on the scope of the equipment to be installed. Floors may be reinforced to support heavy transformers and switchgear. Walls and ceilings may have to support a heavy cable tray system or busbars. Additional ventilation or air conditioning may be needed, since electrical apparatus gives off heat but the temperature must not rise beyond the tolerance of equipment. Double doors may be installed to allow for maintenance of large equipment. If utility service entrance equipment and metering is present in the room, special provisions may be made for access by utility personnel. Fire detection and fire suppression systems, such as carbon dioxide, may be installed.

A large electrical room may have extensive provisions for grounding (earthing) and bonding enclosures of electrical equipment to prevent stray voltage and danger of electric shock, even during faults in the electrical system. Lightning protection requires different measures than protection from power-frequency faults. Electrical rooms may have electromagnetic shielding to prevent interference to nearby sensitive audio or video equipment. In large facilities access control systems may control admission to the room.

== Regulations ==
Layout details and construction of electrical rooms will be controlled by local building code and electrical code regulations. Requirements for an electrical room relate to fire safety and electrical hazards. An electrical room is usually required to be secured from access by unauthorized persons; these rules are especially strict where equipment within the room has exposed live terminals. Regulations may require two separate means of exit from a room where the power rating of circuits exceeds some threshold, to allow for quick exit in an emergency. Rooms containing oil-filled equipment may be required to have fire-resistant construction or active fire suppression equipment in the room and may be designated as an electrical vault. Since power distribution often requires large numbers of electrical cables, special measures for fire resistance of cables and cable trays may be also specified by regulations.

In industrial buildings that handle flammable gases or liquids, or combustible dusts, special electrical rooms may be prepared that have ventilation and other measures to prevent an explosion hazard that would otherwise exist with electrical equipment in hazardous areas. For large installations, it may be less costly overall to use a special room than to install a large number of devices that are resistant to the hazardous conditions. Similarly, in wet or corrosive environments, electrical equipment may be separated in a room that can be protected from the atmospheric conditions.

Building code and electrical code regulations will dictate minimal working space around equipment to allow safe access during maintenance. Practical design of an electrical room will consider layout of the initial equipment and allow for additions over the economic life of the facility.

== See also ==
- Utility vault
- Electrical enclosure
