= Royal Households of the United Kingdom =

Collective departments of the British royal family

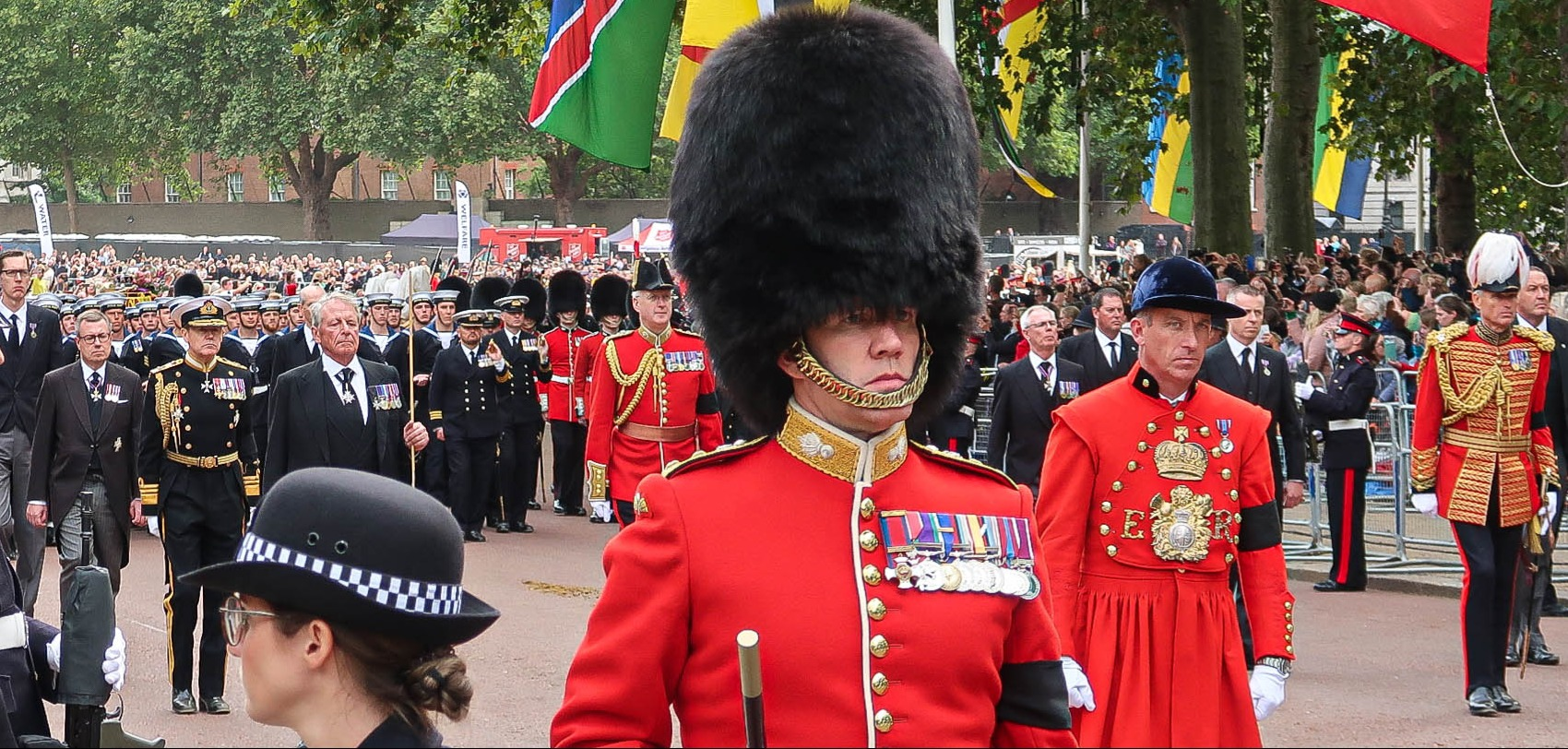
Members of the Royal Household of Elizabeth II walked ahead of the gun carriage at her state funeral, including her Private Secretary, the Master of the Household, Lord Steward, Comptroller of the Lord Chamberlain's Office, Keeper of the Privy Purse, Director of the Royal Collection and Master of the Horse, along with her Palace Steward and Pages.

The Royal Households of the United Kingdom are the collective departments that support members of the British royal family. The Royal Household (singular) supports the Sovereign. Other members of the royal family who undertake public duties have separate households; they vary considerably in size, from the medium-sized household that supports the Prince and Princess of Wales to those supporting junior working royals (with just a handful of members).

In addition to the royal officials and support staff, the sovereign's own household incorporates representatives of other estates of the realm, including the government, the military, and the church. Government whips, defence chiefs, clergy, scientists, musicians, poets, and artists hold honorary positions within the Royal Household. In this way, the Royal Household may be seen as having a symbolic, as well as a practical, function: exemplifying the monarchy's close relationship with other parts of the constitution and of national life.

The offices of the Royal Household are some of the oldest administrative entities in the UK, from which over time the other principal offices of State emerged: for example, HM Treasury was, in its pre-conquest origins, a strong-box kept for safety in the king's bedchamber, where it was overseen by one of the chamberlains (whose role would later evolve into the office of Lord High Treasurer). Parts of the Royal Household continued to play a central role in the government of the country up until the 1530s, and the four Great Officers of the Household (Note: viz.: the Lord Steward, Lord Chamberlain, Groom of the Stole and Master of the Horse) routinely had a seat in the Cabinet until the mid-18th century.

== Terminology ==
The royal household refers to the personnel providing domestic service to the monarch. Historically, the royal court included the household in addition to long-term and short-term guests of the monarch, referred to as courtiers. The royal court of the United Kingdom is officially named the Court of St James's because St. James's Palace is the monarch's official residence. No monarch has lived at St. James's Palace since 1837, but ambassadors to the United Kingdom are still formally accredited to the Court of St. James's.

The term 'Househoulde' first appears in English in 1382, and it began to be used for the king and his entourage shortly afterwards (c. 1387). Prior to this date Latin terms were used (e.g. domus regia (12th century) or hospitium regis (13th century)); Latin terms continued to be used, alongside English ones, until the 1550s. The word 'court' (as in royal court) first appears in the 12th century, but, together with the word 'courtier', only came into common use in this context in the late 1470s, foreshadowing the more lavish and public displays of courtly life that characterised the Tudor period.

The terminology of 'Hall' and 'Chamber' appears from an early date; in time it came to refer not only to significant and sizeable rooms in the royal palaces but also to the principal administrative divisions of the Royal Household (overseen respectively by a steward and a chamberlain). Under the Steward were placed all the 'below stairs' offices of the Household, responsible for the provision of food, drink, fuel and candles to the king and his court; whereas the Chamberlain had charge of the 'above stairs' offices, which supported the public life of the monarch and all kinds of court ceremonial. The equivalent 'outdoor' office was termed the Stables (overseen by a marshal). Over time, lesser rooms (such as the Wardrobe and the Bedchamber) likewise became metonyms for departments of the Household that, in their time, wielded significant powers.

In the 15th century an ambiguity arose with regard to terminology: the two principal divisions (overseen by the Lord Steward and Lord Chamberlain) began to be referred to as the Household and Chamber respectively, (rather than the Hall and Chamber); this usage only began to recede following the formation of the Lord Steward's Department and the Lord Chamberlain's Department in the late 18th century.

== History ==
In the medieval period, there was little, if any, distinction made between the public and private capacities of the monarch: "The land, the people, the law-courts, the army were as much the King's own personal possessions as were his various demesne manors or the furniture of his palaces". Thus, under the Norman kings of England, the Curia Regis ('King's Court') was engaged in every aspect of the management of State affairs – financial, administrative, legislative, judicial, diplomatic – as well as in providing for the day-to-day needs of the monarch and his entourage.

In the twelfth century, the Curia Regis began to disintegrate. Key departments to separate themselves from the Curia Regis were the Exchequer (substantially independent by the end of the twelfth century) and the Chancery (which gained independence more gradually through the thirteenth and early fourteenth century). The Exchequer and Chancery soon became (respectively) the principal accounting and administrative offices of The Crown, overseen by two high officials: the Treasurer and the Chancellor (respectively). Both these officials predated the establishment of their departments: within the Court, the Chancellor had kept the King's official seal since before the Norman conquest; while the office of Treasurer dated from the reign of William I, when the (previously mobile) Treasury found a more permanent home (together with its attendant chamberlain) in Winchester Castle. Their offices also had a judicial character, as seen in the parallel (and inseparable) development of the Court of Exchequer and the Court of Chancery; other courts of law continued to emerge from the Curia Regis in the thirteenth century: first the Common Bench and later the King's Bench.

References to the King's Household, as a distinctive aspect of Court, served initially to differentiate the body of courtiers that continued to serve the immediate needs of the monarch, and to travel with him, as distinct from those more closely identified with what became departments of State with a settled existence 'out of Court'.

=== Anglo-Saxon period (871–1066) ===
The royal household has roots in a Germanic king's chosen warrior companions (Latin: comitatus) who pledged to defend and, when necessary, die with their king. In return for their loyalty, the king gifted these companions food, treasure, and land. In the pagan period, the thyle (Latin: orator) was also a member of the household. He was part counselor, storyteller, and entertainer. With Christianisation, priests assumed prominent roles in the household. The thyle disappeared, his role as counselor taken over by the priests and as entertainer by the scop or minstrel.

The king's companion evolved into the king's thegn (Latin: minister regis), an aristocratic land-owning class. According to Asser's Life of King Alfred, Alfred the Great (r. 871–899) divided his thegns into three groups with each group living one month at court and two months at their own estates in rotation. Alfred made his court into a center of learning, and the sons of nobles were sent there to be educated.

Some thegns had specific duties within the household. In his will, King Eadred (r. 946–955) bequeathed money to various officials. The highest ranking officers received 80 gold mancuses each:

- Dish-thegns (Old English: discðegnas), or seneschals, supervised the royal table. The æthelings or princes had their own dish-thegn.
- Raiment-thegns (Old English: hræglðegnas), or chamberlains, served in the royal apartments and wardrobe. These officials were also called bur-thegns (Old English: burðegnas).
- Byrelas (Latin: pincernae), or butlers, served as cup-bearers and supervised the royal cellar.

King Eadred also bequeathed thirty mancuses to each steward Old English: stigweard. It is possible that stewards were responsible for administering royal estates There were also marshals (horsethegns) in charge of the royal stables and household travel.

These officials were men of high status, not menial servants. Osburh, daughter of Oslac the butler, married King Æthelwulf (r. 839–858) and was the mother of King Alfred. Historian Ann Williams writes of Oslac, "Obviously his duties did not include personally cleaning the family silver or decanting the port, though he presumably oversaw those who did perform analogous tasks."

Service in the royal household could lead to higher office. King Eadwig's dish-thegn Ælfheah became the ealdorman of central Wessex. Likewise, Æthelred the Unready's dish-thegn Æthelmær the Stout became ealdorman of the western shires.

The Merovingian and Carolingian royal households had similar offices, and there is evidence that it influenced its English counterpart. However, there was no English equivalent to the powerful office of major domus (Latin for "mayor of the palace"), and English kings maintained ultimate authority over their households.

The household included royal chaplains. These priests performed religious duties in addition to composing charters, writs, and other documents. Service in the royal chapel could be a stepping stone towards becoming a bishop. By the reign of Edward the Confessor (r. 1042–1066), the chapel's writing office had custody of the great seal used to authenticate writs.

Cnut the Great (r. 1016–1035) introduced officers known as stallers, who were close to the king and very wealthy. There could be as many as eight stallers at once, and they probably supervised the housecarls (royal bodyguards).

Even though it traveled constantly with the king as an itinerant court, the royal household was the center of the Anglo-Saxon government. Initially, household officers performed domestic tasks (such as overseeing food, clothing, royal stables, or travel). As the king's administrative and judicial responsibilities expanded, public duties were delegated to household officers, making them state officers as well.

=== Anglo-Norman period (1066–1154) ===
After the Norman Conquest the ducal household of Normandy (with seneschal, cup-bearer, chamberlain and constable) appears to have been replicated in England and merged into the English court. The Anglo-Norman French term 'seneschal' came to be translated as 'steward' in English.

==== Constitutio Domus Regis ====
The Constitutio Domus Regis, dating from the end of the reign of King Henry I (r. 1100–1135), provides the earliest surviving account of the household. The senior figures (according to their remuneration) were:

- the chancellor (Latin: cancellarius)
- the seneschals (or stewards) (Latin: dapiferi)
- the master butler (Latin: magister pincerna)
- the master chamberlain (Latin: magister camerarius)
- the treasurer (Latin: thesaurarius)
- the constables (Latin: constabularii)

The above six office-holders were paid five shillings per day; the chancellor received this invariably, but the others' pay was reduced on days when they ate in hall at the king's expense.

The office of chancellor was still comparatively new, but it appears from his remuneration that he held a degree of seniority within the household. The chancellor was a senior churchman and head of the Chapel; he also had custody of the great seal, used to validate documents issued in the king's name. Working under him were the master of the writing office (magister scriptorii), the chaplain keeper (capellanus custos) of the chapel and relics, and several clerks. The clerks (who were clerics) drafted official documents and also served in the chapel, which saw to the king's spiritual needs: there they said mass, heard confessions, and kept custody of the royal relics. The chancellor's department (the chancery) was named after the screen (Latin cancella) which separated the clerks from the main body of the hall.

The seneschals (or stewards) and the butler between them provided food and drink for the king's hall. They oversaw various subsidiary officers who, although they received a lower wage, were far from being menial servants, as evidenced by the example of one Roger, who served as larderer to Henry I and was afterwards appointed Bishop of Hereford.

The chamber saw to the king's personal needs and was the main financial office of the government. It had two divisions: the royal bedchamber (Latin: camera regis) and the chamber of the court (Latin: camera curie). The latter chamber handled the finances; albeit by this time the treasurer is named alongside the master chamberlain, serving as head of an emerging new department (namely the Exchequer). Under the master chamberlain were lesser chamberlains and others, who undertook various practical duties.

The constables oversaw the outdoor staff and the familia militaris (Latin for military household). The outdoor staff included huntsmen, houndsmen, and foresters. The military household were knights who received wages and formed the backbone of the army. Historian C. W. Hollister likened it to "something between a royal bodyguard [...] and a small standing army."

Also listed is the master marshal (magister marescallus). It is known from later references (c. 1170) that the master marshal was responsible for preserving order within the verge of the king's court (a jurisdiction that became known as the marshalsea); similarly, at time of war he had charge of military discipline. He also had financial duties: keeping a tally of certain household expenditures, and in wartime functioning as paymaster of the military. Assisting the master marshal were four other marshals.

=== Plantagenet period (1154–1485) ===
The formation of the Exchequer marked the beginning of the separation of government functions from the king's Court. As the treasurer had emerged alongside the chamberlain, taking over some of the latter's financial responsibilities, so another official emerged at this time: the chief justiciar, who took on some of the historic duties of the seneschal or steward. The justiciar quickly became a person of great importance in the realm (his role being analogous to that of the king's chief minister when the monarch was in the country, and akin to a regent when he was not). He had his headquarters in the Exchequer, however, and is not generally considered an officer of the household.

==== Evolution of Great Officers of State and of the Household ====
There had been a tendency in Normandy for the highest Court appointments to become hereditary offices, held under terms of grand serjeanty, and in the 12th century this began to happen likewise in England. Thus by the end of the reign of Henry II (r. 1154–1189), the office of steward (later termed Lord High Steward) was attached to the Earls of Leicester, that of chamberlain (Lord Great Chamberlain) to the Earls of Oxford, that of butler (Chief Butler of England) to the family of William de Albini (later Earls of Arundel), that of constable (Lord High Constable) to the Earls of Hereford and that of marshal (later Earl Marshal) to the family of John FitzGilbert (later passing by marriage to the Earls of Norfolk).

As part of this process, the above-mentioned great officers of state ceased to attend court except on State or special occasions. Their domestic duties therefore had to be undertaken by others. They seem at first to have been shared among several officers bearing the same or similar titles (the 1135 Constitutio lists multiple senior and subsidiary officials with the titles of steward, chamberlain, butler, constable and marshal). In due course, the domestic responsibilities of the steward and chamberlain devolved upon two senior officers 'of the Household': the Lord Steward of the Household and Lord Chamberlain of the Household. The Lord High Constable and Earl Marshal retained their military authority until a comparatively late period. As regards the latter's domestic duties, a 'Marshal of the Household' (later known as the Knight Marshal) maintained discipline within the Verge from the 13th century, while a 'Marshal of the Exchequer' took care of the marshal's erstwhile financial duties.

Neither the chancellor (later Lord High Chancellor) nor the treasurer (Lord High Treasurer) became hereditary offices, as they were more clearly engaged in the government of the realm (which required them to be present); they were also ecclesiastics, which precluded the possibility of legitimate heirs. Although not hereditary, these high offices were routinely offered for sale or rent, until reforms were enacted in the 13th century.

==== Brief flourishing of the Wardrobe ====
The emergence of autonomous departments of State from within the Court had a lasting effect on the shape of the medieval Royal Household, because something was needed to fill the gap that they left (the monarch still required a financial and administrative office). At first the Chamber filled this role; but those who sought to limit monarchical power at this time took great care to maintain the authority of the Exchequer and Chancery over any potential rival office developing within the Household. Thus, while some parts of the Royal Household had a relatively settled continuity of existence through this period (including the extensive 'below-stairs' establishment overseen by the Lord Steward), the Chamber came under sustained political pressure: particularly during the reign of King John, it was subject to various restrictions on its activity and autonomy. For this reason the effectiveness of the Chamber as the King's de facto administrative and financial office waned, and in its place, a new department came to the fore: the Wardrobe.

Named after an annexe to the Chamber in which clothes, armour and other valuables were stored, the Wardrobe grew under Henry III and Edward I until it rivalled the Exchequer in its spending and bypassed the Chancery in its issuing of writs. Its senior officials became close confidants to the King: the Keeper of the Wardrobe and the Controller of the Wardrobe. The former went on to subsume the office (and title) of Treasurer of the Chamber; the latter had custody of the King's Privy Seal, which (unlike the Great Seal, which was kept by the Chancellor in the Chancery) always travelled with the monarch, including overseas.

It was at times of war that the Wardrobe came into its own as an effective means not only of communication but also of fundraising for the Sovereign. This was not without risk, however, and on occasion the Wardrobe found itself having to be bailed out by the Exchequer. Under a weaker king, Edward II, the Exchequer reasserted its authority; the Ordinances of 1311 severely curtailed its independence, with the result that the Wardrobe was eventually subsumed back entirely into the Household and placed under the authority of the Lord Steward. Its senior officers (the Treasurer, Controller and Cofferer of the Wardrobe) were re-designated 'of the Household'; together with the Lord Steward, they later constituted the Board of Green Cloth (which oversaw the Household accounts).

The office of Cofferer of the Household was suppressed in 1782; but those of Treasurer of the Household and Comptroller of the Household continue to be held as sinecure positions by members of HM Government.

==== The Chamber's authority reasserted ====
The demise of the Wardrobe led to the re-emergence of the Chamber (and Chamberlain) as an office (and person) of influence. While the Wardrobe held sway, the Chamber had continued to operate at a domestic level: providing the place (and entourage) for the king to sleep, eat his meals and meet with visitors. The Chamber was scarcely mentioned in the 1311 Ordinances (the Barons not wishing to legislate over the monarch's domestic arrangements), so it now found itself well-placed to take back authority over financial and administrative matters on behalf of the King. Funding was provided out of certain estates forfeited to the Crown (including those of the Knights Templar).

By 1389 a vice-chamberlain was in place as deputy to the Lord Chamberlain. The Chamber continued to retain its long-established personnel: Yeomen, Valets, Esquires and Knights of the Chamber; the yeomen and valets undertook more menial tasks (making the beds and stoking the fires), while the Esquires fulfilled particular tasks in direct relation to the King (e.g. as his carver or cup-bearer) and some of them were designated Gentleman Ushers of the Court. Guard duties were performed by the Serjeants at Arms.

Wherever administrative or financial skills were required, clerks were employed – a word which in this period signified clergy. At their head, during this period of growth in the mid-fourteenth century, was the Receiver. The Privy Seal, now removed from the influence of the Wardrobe, was given its own dedicated Lord Keeper, who initially operated within the structure of the Chamber.

Before long, however, moves were again made to limit the Household as a direct agency of kingly power. The Keeper of the Privy Seal, together with his office of clerks, was removed from the sphere of the Court and followed the Exchequer and the Chancery to Westminster, where, like them, it took on the guise of a department of State. In place of the Privy Seal, a new seal (later known as the signet) began to be used by the King, administered by a clerk in his Household who later came to be called the King's Secretary (precursor of the present-day Secretaries of State).

Domestic household expenses in the 13th-14th centuries
King	Year(s)	Cost	Inflation adjusted
Henry III	1236–37	£4,000	£5,193,533 today
Edward I	N/A	£7,000–£14,000 per year	£7,628,821–£15,257,642 today
Edward II	1324–25	£4,500	£3,743,890 today
Edward III	N/A	£10,000–£12,000 per year	£11,314,570–£13,577,484 today
Edward III	after 1340	£20,000 per year	£17,978,706 today

==== Great Hall and Great Chamber ====
Down to the reign of King Edward II, the Great Hall (the largest room in the palace) had been the centre of courtly life: a place of political meetings, public ceremonies and courtly social gatherings. Under his successor Edward III, however, the focus of activity moved to a more private room behind the dais of the Hall: the Great Chamber. While the king continued to use the Hall on special occasions, for ceremonies, feasts and entertainments, the main focus of Court life shifted to the Chamber, where (when in residence) the king and his closest advisers were usually to be found.

Nevertheless, the Hall still remained in regular daily use as the place where the majority of the household ate their meals. (Meals were provided as part of their remuneration and they were expected to sit down together to eat; but only a select few took their meals in the Chamber with the king.)

Over time the Great Chamber came to be divided into a suite of rooms; for example, in the Tower of London, Henry III's Great Chamber was converted by King Edward IV into an audience chamber, privy chamber and bedchamber. Another small adjoining room, the privy closet, functioned as a small private chapel.

==== The Stables ====
In the early 1300s the royal studs, stables and horses were under the office of the marshalsea, overseen at that time by the keeper of the wardrobe (the master marshal, or Earl Marshal as he was now called, having long since ceased to have a direct relationship with the Stables). Overseeing care and management of the horses from day to day were two officials called harbingers: one responsible for the royal palfreys and destriers, the other for pack and cart horses (which provided transport for the itinerant royal court). The former (also known as 'keeper of the king's great horses') had three serjeant-marshals working under him, the first being responsible for 'the stable of the king', the second for great horses kept (in various places) outside the household, the third for the royal studs (located at a dozen sites around the kingdom). In the 1360s, however, the network of studs and of horses 'outside the household' was disestablished and their associated serjeant-marshal posts were abolished. By the mid-1390s, the responsibilities of the remaining serjeant-marshal had been amalgamated with those of the keeper of the king's great horses under a new title: Master of the Horse.

==== The Black Book of the Household ====
In the Liber Niger Domus Regis Angliae (the 'Black Book of the Household' of Edward IV, written between 1467 and 1477), the domain of the Hall is termed the Domus Providencie ('Household of Providence') and that of the Chamber the Domus Regie Magnificencie ('Royal Household of Magnificence'). The Domus Providencie was overseen by the Steward, the Domus Magnificencie by the Chamberlain.

Also within the domain of the Steward was the Board of Green Cloth, here called the Domus Compotis, Consilii et Judicii ('Household of Control, Counsel and Judgement'). This functioned both as the Household's counting house and as its judgement seat: "for at the green-cloth is always represented the King's power touching matters of this Household". The green cloth itself was a tablecloth, charged with the arms of the Board: on a field of green a key crossed with a rod of silver, "signifying that this office may close, open or punish other offices".

Household personnel of Edward IV
Domus Providencie (Hall)	Domus Magnificencie (Chamber)
Steward of the Household	King's Chamberlain
The Great Hall (where most of the household officers ate)	The Great Chamber (where the king ate with selected lords) (Note: the King's Chamberlain, Secretary and Confessor customarily had their meals in the Chamber; those in attendance included an Esquire and Knight of the Body, the Chaplains, Physician and Surgeon, two Gentlemen Ushers (who kept a record of all Chamber expenses) and four of the yeomen (the yeoman of beds, yeoman of robes and two yeomen ushers). All others ate in the Hall.)
Marshals of the Hall (Note: The marshals provided an equivalent service in the Hall as the Gentlemen Ushers did in the Chamber: supervising staff, overseeing activities and maintaining order and decorum.); Ushers of the Hall; Sewers of the Hall	4 Knights of the Chamber (Note: Knights Banneret or Bachelor, who served the king at table as carvers or cupbearers); 12 Knights of the Household (Note: 'most valiant men' recruited from around the country, four of whom were always on duty 'continually abiding and attending upon the king's person in court'.); 40 Squires of the Household (Note: of whom 20 were on duty at any one time. These were men chosen for their 'possession, worship and wisdom'; from 'sundry Shires' (so that from them 'it may be known the disposition of all the countries'). They were to be 'attendant upon the king's person, in riding, and going at all times'. They also helped serve meals, in both the Chamber and the Hall.); The King's Secretary (and 4 Clerks of the Signet); 4 Chaplains (Note: Two to be on duty in the Chamber, two in the Hall); 4 Esquires of the Body (Note: Two of whom were always 'attendant on the king's person, to array and unarray him' and 'to watch day and night'.); The King's Sewar (Note: Co-ordinated the serving of the king's meals.); 4 Gentleman Ushers of the Chamber; 24 Yeomen of the Crown (Note: The Yeomen of the Crown were a corps of yeomen archers, whose members were allocated to specific duties at court: one to be yeoman of the robes, another yeoman of the beds, two to serve as yeomen ushers of the chamber, and others as yeomen of the armoury, of bows, of dogs, of books and of other items.); 4 Yeomen of the Chamber (Note: They made beds, carried torches, laid tables and provided various other services at the Chamberlain's request.); 10 Grooms of the Chamber; 4 Pages of the Chamber; Also listed are: A Doctor in Physick, Master Surgeon, Apothecary and Barber; 6 Henxmen (and a Master to teach them) (Note: These appear to have been either young men or adolescent boys, who received instruction in horsemanship, jousting and other noble arts, whilst also being in attendance on the king.); Kings of Arms, Heralds and Pursuivants; 4 Serjeants-at-Arms; 13 Minstrels and a Waite (Note: 'that nightly [...] pipeth the watch'.); 4 Messengers; The Chapel: A Dean of Chapel; 26 Chaplains and Clerks of the Chapel; 2 Yeomen of the Chapel (Note: Youths, described as 'growing from the children of the chapel by succession of age, and after that their voices change'.); 8 Children of the Chapel (and a Master to teach them); The Clerk of the Closet and Serjeant of the Vestry.; Other offices: The Jewel House (under the Keeper of the King's Jewels); The Wardrobe of Robes (under a yeoman); The Wardrobe of Beds (under a yeoman)
Offices concerned with the provision of food, drinks and other items (each overseen by a Serjeant): (Note: There were also smaller departments (overseen by yeomen) such as the Office of Waferers and the Office of Lavendry.): Office of the Bakehouse; Office of the Pantry; Office of the Cellar (Note: the Serjeant of the Cellar also oversaw the Butlery of Ale.); Office of the Confectionary; Office of the Chandlery; Office of the Ewery and Napery; Overseen by a Chief Master Clerk: Office of the Great Spicery; Overseen by a Chief Butler: Office of the Butler of England
Domus Compotis, Consilii et Judicii (Board of Green Cloth): Steward of the Household; Treasurer of the Household; Comptroller of the Household; Cofferer of the Household; Two Clerks of the Green Cloth; A Clerk of Controlment; Office of the Counting House (staffed by a Serjeant Usher) (Note: "to keep the door, to keep the treasure, to keep the books and to attend diligently upon this office".)

The Liber Niger appears to be unfinished: the surviving manuscripts end abruptly with the Office of Lavendry; some offices referred to earlier in the manuscript (or in other sources) are missing. Among the Household offices omitted from the Liber are the:

- Kitchen
- Larder
- Acatry
- Poultry
- Boiling House
- Scalding House
- Pastry
- Scullery
- Harbingers
- Almoners
- Porters
- Woodyard
- Stables

=== The Tudor period (1485–1603) ===
Under Henry VII the Chamber was equipped once again to serve as a powerful and efficient financial office, to be funded by income from the Crown lands (bypassing the Exchequer). In 1487, Henry revived the office of Treasurer of the Chamber in order to secure and manage this income. These arrangements were maintained for a time, until the departments of State were reformed under Thomas Cromwell, beginning in the 1530s.

==== Growing influence of the Privy Chamber ====
In 1495 King Henry VII effected an administrative separation between the Chamber (which, under the Chamberlain, continued to retain its public and ceremonial character and functions) and the Privy Chamber (which, under the Groom of the Stool, was separated off as a more private and intimate space). Under Henry VII the Privy Chamber was staffed by relatively humble servants who took care of the king's more personal requirements and bodily needs; but under his successor, King Henry VIII, it began to be filled with close companions of high birth and influence.

Henry had come to the throne accompanied by an influential group of young noblemen, who were nicknamed 'the king's minions'. When Francis I of France despatched a delegation to England in 1518, to sign a peace treaty drawn up by Cardinal Wolsey, it included some of that monarch's most trusted courtiers who bore the title Gentilshommes de la Chambre ('Gentlemen of the Chamber'). So when Henry sent a group of his 'minions' as part of a reciprocal delegation to Paris later that same year, he gave them a parallel title: Gentlemen of the Privy Chamber. In this role, the Gentlemen came to control access to the king's private rooms (and thus to the king himself). This created difficulties for the more established courtiers. Powerful individuals on the outside (such as Thomas Wolsey and Anne Boleyn) did their best to infiltrate the chamber and its entourage.

Before long the Privy Chamber became a "fully fledged third department of the Royal Household", eclipsing both Chamber and Household in its prestige and in power. By the end of the 1530s it was functioning as a fully autonomous financial and administrative office with its own paid staff. The six Gentlemen of the Privy Chamber were akin to the king's chief ministers: they had oversight of the Privy Purse and administered the royal sign-manual.

The Chief Gentleman of the Privy Chamber was the Groom of the Stool, who thus became one of the most powerful officials in the household: he acted as a royal gatekeeper, allowing or denying other officials access to the privy lodgings (and thus to the monarch). In addition to the Gentlemen, the Privy Chamber had its own select staff, who operated under the Groom of the Stool (rather than the Lord Chamberlain): two Gentlemen Ushers of the Privy Chamber kept the doors, and oversaw the serving of meals and other practical arrangements; they were assisted by four Grooms of the Privy Chamber. The king's barber and a page were also in attendance daily.

On festivals and great days of celebration the king would still be seen in the Great Hall or Chamber, and he granted audiences in the latter (which, for clarity, came to be known as the Presence Chamber); but otherwise, once he was within the palace, the king was seldom to be seen outside the Privy Chamber.

While under Henry VIII the Privy Chamber served both as an administrative office and as a circle of royal companionship, under both Mary I and Elizabeth I (whose intimate servants were necessarily women) these functions were separated. Mary maintained a full complement of Gentlemen of the Privy Chamber, but alongside them appointed Ladies and Gentlewomen of the Privy Chamber. Elizabeth did likewise, appointing Kat Ashley to serve as Chief Gentlewoman of the Privy Chamber (which became more clearly a personal rather than an administrative space, though it remained a sphere of influence).

==== Thomas Cromwell's Reforms ====
In the medieval period the king's Household had been actively involved in the business of government. Under Henry VII it remained 'the most active agency of national administration'; in the reign of Henry VIII, however, Thomas Cromwell undertook a series of reforms, designed to separate the work of government from the king's domestic life. Outside the Household, the role of the King's Secretary was strengthened, evolving under Elizabeth I into the office of Secretary of State, the Privy Council was strengthened and the Exchequer was reorganised.

Within the Royal Household, Cromwell sought to bring together its disparate offices and to limit the power of the Chamber (which had of late extended its financial and administrative influence over the State). The Board of Green Cloth, presided over by the Lord Steward, was thenceforward given a degree of financial responsibility across the whole Household (not just the 'below stairs' offices, as had formerly been the case). The Treasurer of the Chamber (who had been at the centre of national financial administration in the previous reign) had his Household responsibilities curtailed, responsibility being given instead to the Cofferer of the Household (de facto executive officer of the Board of Green Cloth) for paying the salaries and benefits in kind of many of the officers of the Chamber (including those of the grooms, the Gentlemen Ushers, the Vice-Chamberlain and the Lord Chamberlain himself).

Thenceforward, the function of the Household was largely limited to the domestic requirements of the king and the ceremonial life of his court. Nevertheless, it remained a place of significant influence and patronage.

=== The Stuart Household ===
==== The Bedchamber ====
When King James VI of Scotland inherited the throne of England as James I, he retained much of the structure (and personnel) of the Elizabethan English court (with the Ladies and Gentlewomen being transferred to his consort's Household). Within this structure, however, he created the office of Gentleman of the Bedchamber to which he appointed members of his Scottish entourage. It immediately took the place of the Privy Chamber as the locus of the King's closest confidants; the First Gentleman of the Bedchamber, Sir Thomas Erskine, was additionally appointed Groom of the Stool in 1604 (an office which had been in abeyance during the reign of Elizabeth I). The Gentlemen of the Privy Chamber were retained, but their salary was taken away; they were, though, provided with board and lodging when on duty).

After the Restoration, Charles II reconstituted the Royal Household without seeking to reduce its size (which had previously grown large and expensive). From as early as 1662 efforts were made to reduce the number of extraneous offices in the household (a process which would continue for decades afterwards). Sale of offices was prevalent at this time, and several were held as lucrative sinecures. Chamberlayne's Present State of England of 1669 said of the Gentlemen of the Bedchamber at this time that they 'consist usually of the prime nobility of England'. As regards their duties, they are 'each one in his turn to wait a week in every quarter in the king's bedchamber, there to lie by the king on a pallet bed all night and in the absence of the groom of the stole to supply his place'. It is also noted that they are required to serve at the king's table when he eats in private, 'for then the cup bearers, carvers and sewers do not wait'.

In the reign of Queen Anne, Ladies of the Bedchamber replaced the Gentlemen, and Bedchamber women replaced the Grooms of the Bedchamber; a pattern which was repeated in later centuries when a queen regnant acceded to the throne. In subsequent Queens' reigns the office of Groom of the Stole likewise went into abeyance, but under Anne it was given to two duchesses in succession, who also served as Mistress of the Robes. (The latter title remained attached to the head of the female Household of a Queen (regnant or consort) up until the reign of Charles III).

== Modern day ==
In its main outlines the existing organisation of the royal household is essentially the same as it was under the Tudors or the Plantagenets. It is divided into three principal departments, at the head of which are the lord steward, the lord chamberlain and the master of the horse, and the respective provinces of which may be generally described as "below stairs", "above stairs" and "out of doors". The duties of these officials, and the various officers under their charge are dealt with in the articles under those headings. When the reigning sovereign is a queen, the royal household is in some other respects rather differently arranged from that of a king and a queen consort.

Under a king and a queen consort, a separate establishment "above stairs" and "out of doors" works for the queen consort. She has a Lord Chamberlain's department of her own, and all the ladies of the court from the Mistress of the Robes to the Maids of Honour are in her service. At the commencement of the reign of Queen Victoria, the two establishments were combined, and considerably reduced. On the accession of Edward VII, the civil list was again reconstituted; while the household of the king and his consort became larger than during the previous reign, redundant or unnecessary offices were merged or abolished.

The household of Elizabeth II included 1,200 employees. This was roughly the same size as Charles II's household but larger than Victoria's, whose staff numbered 921.

== The King and Queen ==
=== Start of the new reign ===
Appointing a new monarch's household can take some time; in 1952 the full list of appointments to the new Queen's household was not published until almost six months after her accession to the throne.

In 2022, walking in the state procession for the state funeral of Elizabeth II, the new King was followed by his Private Secretary, Principal Private Secretary, Master of the Household and two Equerries; however, since the King's new household had yet to be appointed, they were gazetted, not as 'His Majesty's Household', but as the 'Household of the former Prince of Wales and Duchess of Cornwall'.

On 13 September, five days after the death of his mother, Queen Elizabeth II, 100 staff who had been working for King Charles III while he was Prince of Wales were notified of potential redundancies. This reflects the uncertain situation of members of the Royal Households at the start of each new reign: in the days following the death of King James I in 1625, the Countess of Bedford remarked that "[w]hat the King's resolution is yet for his own and his father's servants, he hath not declared (farther than the white staves, which are to remain as they were); but for the green cloth and other inferior officers both of the household and chamber, it is thought that he will employ his own and dismiss his father's, because he hath caused the latter all to be removed to Denmark House to attend the body, and lodged the former about himself at Whitehall".

As consort of the British sovereign, Queen Camilla has a household of her own. Traditionally, queens consort have appointed their own Lord Chamberlain and various ladies-in-waiting as part of their household. There was likewise a Household of Prince Philip, Duke of Edinburgh. This tradition was scrapped in accordance with the King's view of having a slimmed-down monarchy, and instead of ladies-in-waiting, Queen Camilla is served by "Queen's companions", a group of six ladies who occupy the new occasional and informal position and who are not involved in tasks such as replying to letters or developing schedules. The Queen's companions are the Marchioness of Lansdowne, Jane von Westenholz, The Hon. Lady Brooke, Sarah Troughton, Lady Sarah Keswick and Baroness Chisholm of Owlpen. Major Ollie Plunket serves as the Queen's equerry. Queen Elizabeth II's ladies-in-waiting were given new roles as "ladies of the household".

=== Present arrangements ===
As of 2022, the household is configured largely according to the arrangements inherited from Elizabeth II. The role of Official Harpist to the Prince of Wales continues as King's Harpist, and is currently held by Mared Pugh Evans.

==== Great Officers ====
The Great Officers of the Household are, in order of seniority, the Lord Steward, the Lord Chamberlain and the Master of the Horse. Only the Lord Chamberlain fulfils an executive function, while the other two continue to have a ceremonial role, and are seen particularly on State occasions.

==== Lord Chamberlain ====
The Royal Household is coordinated by the part-time Lord Chamberlain (Lord Benyon).

==== Heads of departments ====
The Private Secretary to the Sovereign (Sir Clive Alderton since 2022), manages the Private Secretary's Office, and controls the Press Office, the Royal Archives, and the Defence Services Secretary's Office, serves as principal advisor to the Sovereign and serves as the principal channel of communication between the Sovereign and their governments. Besides these, he also manages the Sovereign's official programme and correspondence.

The Keeper of the Privy Purse has responsibility for the Sovereign's personal finances and those to do with semi-private concerns, along with, as Treasurer to the King oversight of the civil list. The two positions are held together and, since 2025, they have both been held by James Chalmers.

The Master of the Household, since 2013, has been Vice Admiral Sir Tony Johnstone-Burt and has overall responsibility for the domestic workings of the Household.

The Lord Chamberlain's Office, led by its Comptroller current Colonel Edwyn Launders MBE, is responsible for official royal occasions.

The Royal Collection Department is overseen by its Director who since February 2018 is Tim Knox.

==== Other units ====
The Royal Almonry, Ecclesiastical Household, and Medical Household are functionally separate. For accounting purposes they are the responsibility of the Keeper of the Privy Purse and Treasurer to the King.

The Crown Equerry has day-to-day operation of the Royal Mews, and is part of the Lord Chamberlain's Office. The other equerries have a different role: attending and assisting the King in his official duties from day to day. (Historically, they too were part of the mews, but today they are entirely separate.)

The Central Chancery of the Orders of Knighthood is also under the Lord Chamberlain's Office, as is the office of the Marshal of the Diplomatic Corps.

The College of Arms has been a branch of the Royal Household since its incorporation in 1484 by King Richard III it was directly appointed by the Sovereign on the recommendation of Earl Marshal. The college is a corporation of thirteen royal heralds, overseen by the Earl Marshal, a hereditary office held by the Duke of Norfolk. The college is self-supporting and receives no funds from the Crown. The college holds jurisdiction over all matters pertaining to heraldry, genealogy, and pedigrees in England, Wales, Northern Ireland and in some Commonwealth realms.

Certain independent and honorific posts include Master of the King's Music, Piper to the Sovereign, Poet Laureate, and Astronomer Royal. The King's Bargemaster, the Keeper of the Jewel House, the Serjeants-at-Arms, and the Warden and Marker of the Swans, perform less celebrated functions.

The offices of Treasurer of the Household, Comptroller of the Household, and Vice-Chamberlain of the Household are held by senior government whips in the House of Commons. In the House of Lords, the Government Chief Whip is usually appointed Captain of the Gentlemen-at-Arms and the Deputy Chief Whip as Captain of the Yeomen of the Guard, with junior whips appointed as lords-in-waiting and baronesses-in-waiting. Occasionally these officers are called upon to undertake Household duties, especially the Vice-Chamberlain, who is responsible for writing regular parliamentary reports for the King.

If the monarch is female she has ladies-in-waiting (formally styled either ladies of the bedchamber or women of the bedchamber), some of whom are in personal attendance on a daily basis. They are overseen by the Mistress of the Robes, who traditionally was head of the female household. If the monarch is male these roles are instead attached to the Household of the Queen consort.

The Household includes a number of honorary military appointments: the aides-de-camp to the King (who are usually very high-ranking officers of the three armed services), the two Gold Sticks and the Vice Admiral and Rear Admiral of the United Kingdom. In addition, the two corps of royal bodyguards (the Gentlemen at Arms and the Yeomen of the Guard) are part of the Household.

Gentlemen ushers are unpaid members of the Royal Household, often retired military officers, who provide occasional assistance as marshals at royal events. The Gentleman Usher of the Black Rod is an important official in the Houses of Parliament; but technically he too is a member of the Royal Household (and acts as the King's messenger at the State Opening).

The royal residences (see list of British royal residences) in current use are cared for and maintained by the Royal Household Property Section directly from the grant-in-aid provided by Parliament, whereas Balmoral Castle and Sandringham House are privately owned and maintained. The unoccupied royal residences (including the Tower of London) are run by the Historic Royal Palaces Agency, which is self-funding.

== The Scottish Royal Household ==
The Royal Household in Scotland includes offices of personal, honorary and state appointments. Many appointments are vacant having fallen into abeyance; been abolished or returned to The Crown; merged with other positions both before and after the Union of the Crown with England; or due to lack of a clear office holder.

The Great Officers of the Royal Household (not to be confused with the Great Officers of State of Scotland which are political and judicial appointments, or the Great Officers of the Crown of Scotland though some officers are shared) are:

- Lord High Constable – Merlin Hay, 24th Earl of Erroll
- Master of the Household – Torquhil Campbell, 13th Duke of Argyll
- Keeper of the Palace of Holyroodhouse – Alexander Douglas-Hamilton, 16th Duke of Hamilton
- Armour-Bearer and Squire of His Majesty's Body – traditionally held by the Setons of Touch
- Bearer of the Royal Banner – Alexander Scrymgeour, 12th Earl of Dundee
- Bearer of the National Flag of Scotland – Ian Maitland, 18th Earl of Lauderdale
- Lord Justice General of Scotland – Paul Cullen, Lord Pentland
- Great Steward of Scotland – Prince William, Duke of Rothesay

Ecclesiastical officers of the Ecclesiastical Household of Scotland:

- Lord High Commissioner to the General Assembly of the Church of Scotland – Lady Elish Angiolini
- Bishop of the Chapel Royal – (Vacant since the ruination of the Chapel Royal and disestablishment of the (Episcopal) Church of Scotland c. 1689)
- Royal Almoner – vacant
- Dean of the Chapel Royal – David Fergusson
- Dean of the Thistle, an officer of the Order of the Thistle – David Fergusson
- 2 Chaplains:
  - The minister at Crathie Kirk
  - The minister at Canongate Kirk
- 10 Church of Scotland Honorary Chaplains to the King

Officers of Administration and Legal Officers:

- Lord High Chamberlain – vacant
- Treasurer of Scotland – vacant
- Comptroller of Scotland – vacant
- Great Marischal of Scotland – vacant
- Knight Marischal – vacant
- Justiciar of Scotia – vacant
- Justiciar of Lothian – vacant
- Justiciar of Galloway – vacant
- King's and Lord Treasurer's Remembrancer – John Logue
- Gentleman Usher of the White Rod – John Armes, Bishop of Edinburgh
- Master of the Mint in Scotland – vacant
- Bailie of the Abbey Court of Holyroodhouse –

Governors, Captains and Keepers of Palaces and Castles:

- Governor of Edinburgh Castle – Major-General Bob Bruce
- Falkland Palace – Ninian Crichton Stuart
- Stirling Castle – the Earl of Mar and Kellie
- Dunstaffnage Castle – the Duke of Argyll
- Dunconnel Castle – Sir Charles Edward Maclean of Dunconnel Bt, 2nd Baronet of Strachur and Glensluain, Baron Strachur
- Linlithgow Palace – vacant
- Carrick Castle – the Duke of Argyll
- Dumbarton Castle – Brigadier Donald Hardie
- Tarbert Castle – the Duke of Argyll
- Dunfermline Palace – vacant
- Castle Sween – the Duke of Argyll
- Blackness Castle – vacant
- Keeper and Ranger of the Park of Holyroodhouse – (Vacant – associated with the Earl of Haddington until 1844)

Heraldic Officers and Keepers of the Regalia:

- Lord Lyon King of Arms – Joseph Morrow
- The Lord Lyon King of Arms's heralds and pursuivants
- Commissioners for the Safekeeping of the Regalia
- Deputy-keeper of the Honours of Scotland
- Yeoman-Keepers of the Honours of Scotland

Officers of the Order of the Thistle:

- Chancellor of the Order of the Thistle – Richard Scott, 10th Duke of Buccleuch
- Secretary of the Order of the Thistle – Mrs Elizabeth Roads
- Gentleman Usher of the Green Rod – Rear Admiral Christopher Hope Layman

The Household Division, Sovereign's Body Guard, King's Guard, and ceremonial military posts and bodies:

- Lieutenant General of the North – vacant
- Lord Warden of the Marches – vacant
- Lord High Admiral of Scotland – vacant
- Vice Admiral of Scotland – vacant
- Admiral of the Western Coasts and Isles – Torquhil Campbell, 13th Duke of Argyll
- Lord High Admiral of the Firth of Forth
- Vice-Admiral of Orkney and Shetland – (Vacant – historically associated with the Sheriff Depute of Orkney and Shetland)
- Gold Stick and Silver Stick for Scotland
- Hereditary Doorward (Hostarius)
- The Royal Company of Archers, the monarch's bodyguard in Scotland
- High Constables and Guard of Honour of the Palace of Holyroodhouse
- Doorward Guard of Partisans – personal retainers of the Lord High Constable of Scotland and bodyguard to the sovereign
- The Scots Guards
- The Mounted Troop of the Royal Scots Dragoon Guards – Ceremonial mounted unit based at Edinburgh Castle, assembled for events such as the Waterloo Day celebrations
- Balaklava Company of The Argyll and Sutherland Highlanders, 5th Battalion, Royal Regiment of Scotland – tasked with State and Ceremonial Duties in Scotland such as mounting the Guard at Holyrood Palace
- Piper to the Sovereign and senior members of the Royal Family
- Her Majesty's state trumpeters in Scotland
- Postilions, Grooms and Footmen of the Scottish State Coach

Other hereditary and non-hereditary offices and Court appointments:

- Master Carver for Scotland – Sir Sebastian Anstruther of Balcluskie
- Butler of Scotland – vacant
- Pantler of Scotland – vacant
- Washer of the Sovereign's Hands in Scotland – Simon Houison Craufurd, 29th Laird of Craufurdland Castle
- Hereditary Royal Falconer of Scotland – John Hugh Borthwick, 24th Lord Borthwick
- Historiographer Royal – Christopher Smout
- His Majesty's Botanist – Professor Stephen Blackmore
- Master of Work to the Crown of Scotland – vacant
- The Painter and Limner – (Vacant since 2021)
- Sculptor in Ordinary for Scotland – Alexander Stoddart
- Surveyor of the King's Pictures – Anna Reynolds
- Astronomer Royal for Scotland – Catherine Heymans
- Geographer Royal for Scotland – Professor Charles Withers
- Various other Royal physicians, surgeons, apothecaries, chemists, etc.
- The Crown Jeweller
- Her Majesty's Clockmaker and Keeper and Dresser of His Majesty's Clocks in Scotland – Hamilton & Inches
- Court Postmaster

== Household of the Prince and Princess of Wales ==
A part-time Private Secretary to Prince William and Prince Harry (James Lowther-Pinkerton Irish Guards (Rtd.)) was appointed in the Household of the Prince of Wales and the Duchess of Cornwall in May 2005. In January 2009, a separate Household of Prince William and Prince Harry was established (formally "The Household of His Royal Highness Prince William of Wales and His Royal Highness Prince Henry of Wales"), headed by Lowther-Pinkerton. Following their marriages, the Household also additionally served their wives. The Household's offices are currently based in Kensington Palace, having formerly been based in St James's Palace. The Household, as of 2011, had the equivalent of 7.8 full-time staff.

It was announced in June 2011 that the Duke and Duchess of Cambridge would temporarily move their official London residence to an apartment in Kensington Palace, a move that was completed in August of that year. The Duke and Duchess' primary residence continued to be the island of Anglesey in Wales, where the Duke served as an RAF search and rescue pilot. The couple previously shared an apartment at Clarence House with Prince Harry, which he retained. On 6 November 2011, it was announced that the Duke, Duchess and Prince Harry, along with Elizabeth II and the Prince of Wales (later King Charles) had approved a plan that would have the Duke and Duchess of Cambridge permanently move to a larger apartment in Kensington Palace in 2013, after it is renovated. This apartment was previously occupied by the Queen's sister, Princess Margaret, Countess of Snowdon and her husband Antony Armstrong-Jones, Earl of Snowdon after their marriage in 1960. The apartment was retained by Princess Margaret after her divorce in 1978 and was her London residence until her death in 2002. Prince Harry then moved his official residence from Clarence House to the apartment vacated by the Cambridges. In addition, once the move was complete, their official household was also moved to Kensington Palace from St James's Palace, although the household remained shared. Until the moves were complete, their Household remained based at St James's Palace and continued to be shared.

It was later announced in early May 2013 that the royal couple's private secretary, James Lowther-Pinkerton, intended to leave his post as private secretary for the private sector, and his position was split with each member of the household receiving a private secretary. In September 2013, Miguel Head became Private Secretary to the Duke of Cambridge and Rebecca Deacon assumed the role of Private Secretary to the Duchess of Cambridge. Ed Perkins left his post as communication secretary at the household in 2014. On 21 November 2014, the palace announced his replacement as Jason Knauf. As of 2025, the Household had 66 people and is led by Ian Patrick, the Private Secretary to the Prince of Wales.

=== List of Household staff ===
Private Secretary to the Duke and Duchess of Cambridge and Prince Harry

- 2005–2013: Major James Lowther-Pinkerton Irish Guards (Retd.) Lowther-Pinkerton left his post in September 2013, but intended to spend one day a week at St James's Palace to act as a sounding board for the much younger members of staff who would take his place.

Private Secretary to the Duke of Cambridge

- 2013–2018: Miguel Head
- 2018–2020: Simon Case
- 2020–2021: Christian Jones

Private Secretary to the Prince of Wales

- 2021–2024: Jean-Christophe Gray
- 2024–present: Ian Patrick

Private Secretary to the Duchess of Cambridge

- 2013–2017: Rebecca Deacon
- 2017–2019: Catherine Quinn
- 2020–2022: Hannah Cockburn-Logie

Private Secretary to the Princess of Wales

- 2024–present: Tom White

Assistant Private Secretary to the Duke of Cambridge

- 2018–2022: Zoë Ware

Assistant Private Secretary to the Princess of Wales

- 2017–: Natalie Barrows

Advisor to the Duke and Duchess of Cambridge

- 2009–2019: Sir David Manning

Advisor to the Prince and Princess of Wales

- 2019–present: Jason Knauf

Head of the Press to the Prince and Princess of Wales

- 2026–: Liza Ravenscroft

Communication Secretary to the Duke and Duchess of Cambridge

- 2014–2019: Jason Knauf
- 2019–2020: Christian Jones

Communication Secretary to the Prince and Princess of Wales

- 2022–present: Lee Thompson

Deputy Communication Secretary to the Duke and Duchess of Cambridge and Prince Harry

- –2016: Nick Loughran

Digital and Social Lead to the Prince and Princess of Wales

- 2020–present: David Watkins

Senior Private Executive Assistant to the Prince and Princess of Wales

- 2024–2025: Natasha Archer

Official Spokesperson for the Duke and Duchess of Cambridge and Prince Harry

- –2013: Paddy Harverson, also Communications Secretary at Clarence House

== Household of the Princess Royal ==
The Household of the Princess Royal provides the administrative support to Anne, Princess Royal, the only sister of the King. The Princess Royal's private residence is Gatcombe Park; her office, headed by the Private Secretary, is based at Buckingham Palace while her official London residence is located at St James's Palace.

=== Private Secretaries to the Princess Royal ===
- 1974–1976: Major Benjamin Herman
- 1976–1982: Major Nicholas Lawson
- 1982–1997: Lieutenant Colonel Sir Peter Gibbs
- 1997–1999: Rupert McGuigan
- 1999–2002: Colonel Timothy Earl
- 2002–2019: Captain Sir Nick Wright
- 2019–2024: Charles Davies
- 2024–present: Colonel John Boyd

=== Assistant Private Secretary ===
- 2010–present: Commander Anne Sullivan LVO RN
- 1988-1997: The Hon. Madeleine Dillon, afterwards Mrs Louloudis

=== Office Secretary ===
- ?–: Mrs Isabella Ward
- ?–: Mrs Anne King

=== Extra Equerry to the Princess Royal ===
- 2019–: Captain Sir Nicholas Wright

=== Ladies in Waiting to the Princess Royal ===
- 1977–present: Mrs Malcolm (later Dame Celia) Innes (Extra Lady-in-Waiting 1987-1998)
- 1987–present: Mrs Timothy Holderness Roddam
- 1988–present: Mrs Charles Ritchie
- 1992–present: Mrs William Nunneley
- 1992–present: Mrs David Bowes Lyon
- 1997–present: The Hon. Mrs Louloudis
- 1970–2024: Miss Mary Dawnay, afterwards Mrs Richard (later Lady) Carew Pole (Extra Lady-in-Waiting 1975-1986)
- 1970–2024: Miss Rowena Brassey, afterwards Mrs Andrew (later Dame Rowena) Feilden (Extra Lady-in-Waiting 1987-1990)
- 1978–2024: The Hon. Mrs (later Dame Shân) Legge-Bourke
- 2005–2024: Mrs. Brian Hammond
- 1974-2016: Miss Victoria Lindsay Legge-Bourke (Extra Lady-in-Waiting 1987-1998)
- 1987-1991: Mrs Malcolm Wallace
- 1987-1988: Leonora, Countess of Lichfield (Extra Lady-in-Waiting 1981-1986, 1989–present)

=== Extra Ladies-in-Waiting to the Princess Royal ===
- 2023–present: Mrs Susanna Cross
- 2024–present: Lady McFarlane
- 2024–present: Lady Elizabeth Leeming
- 2024–present: Mrs John Armstrong
- 2024–present: Mrs Dolly Maude
- 2024–present: Mrs Simon (Susan) Rhodes, LVO

== Household of the Duke and Duchess of Edinburgh ==
The Household of the Duke and Duchess of Edinburgh provides administrative support to the Prince Edward, Duke of Edinburgh, youngest brother of the King, and to his wife, the Duchess of Edinburgh. While their private residence is Bagshot Park, their office, headed by the private secretary, is based at Buckingham Palace.

=== Private Secretary and Equerry to the Prince Edward ===
In 1980 Sqn Ldr Adam Wise was appointed to assist the Prince with his work – although he still shared staff with the Queen and Prince Andrew. In 1983, Wise was appointed Private Secretary and Equerry to the Princes Edward and Andrew. When he stepped down in 1987, Lt Col. Sean O'Dwyer was appointed – also jointly with Prince Andrew.

- 1983–1987: Sqn Ldr Adam Wise
- 1987–2001: Lt Col. Sean O'Dwyer Irish Guards (Retd.)

=== Private Secretary to the Earl and Countess of Wessex ===
- 2002–2014: Brig. John Smedley
- 2014–2018: Mr. Tim Roberts

=== Private Secretary to the Duke of Edinburgh ===
- 2019–2023: Captain Andrew Aspden
- 2023–present: Brigadier Alexander Potts

=== Private Secretary to the Duchess of Edinburgh ===
- 2019–present: Captain Alexander Stonor

=== Lady-in-Waiting to the Duchess of Edinburgh ===
- 2011-??: Mrs Amy Mayes
- 2009-??: Miss Sarah Sienesi
- 2007-??: Miss Suzanne Lofthouse (Extra Lady in Waiting) (also Assistant Private Secretary)

== Lesser households ==
=== Household of the Duke and Duchess of Gloucester ===
- Lady-in-waiting to the Duchess of Gloucester: Mrs Susan Wigley

=== Household of Prince and Princess Michael of Kent ===
- Private Secretary to Prince Michael of Kent at Kensington Palace: Mr Nicholas Chance (1997–2016)

== Former households ==
=== Household of the Duke of Edinburgh ===
The Household of the Duke of Edinburgh provided administrative support to Prince Philip, Duke of Edinburgh as consort of Queen Elizabeth II; it was based at Buckingham Palace. (Before his wife's accession they had maintained a joint household). The Household was initially composed of a Treasurer (the senior officer), a Private Secretary an Equerry and an Extra Equerry. The posts of Treasurer and Private Secretary were sometimes combined.

==== Treasurer ====
- 1952–1959: Lt Gen. Sir Frederick Browning
- Acting, 1957–1960: Capt. David Alexander
- 1959–1970: R Adm Sir Christopher Bonham-Carter (served as Treasurer and Private Secretary from July–December 1970)
- 1970–1982: Lord Rupert Nevill (Private Secretary and Treasurer from 1976)
- 1982–1984: Sir Richard Davies
- 1984–2000: Sir Brian McGrath (Private Secretary and Treasurer until 1993)

==== Private Secretary ====
- 1952–1957: Lt Cdr Michael Parker
- 1957–1970: James Orr
- 1970–1976: Cdr William Willett
- 1976–1982: Lord Rupert Nevill (Private Secretary and Treasurer)
- 1982–1993: Brian McGrath, Esq. (Private Secretary and Treasurer from 1984)
- 1993–2010: Brigadier Sir Miles Hunt-Davis (Private Secretary and Treasurer from 2000)
- 2010–2021: Brigadier Archie Miller-Bakewell (Private Secretary and Treasurer)

==== Equerry ====
- 1948-1952: Lt Michael Parker (Equerry to Princess Elizabeth and the Duke of Edinburgh)
- 1953-1956: Sqn Ldr Beresford Horsley
- 1956-1958: Sqn Ldr H. M. Chinnery
- 1958-1961: Sqn Ldr J. de M. Severne
- 1961-1965: Sqn Ldr D. J. Checketts
- 1965-1968: Maj. A. T. W. Duncan
- 1968-1971: Maj. R. H. Cooke
- 1971-1974: Maj. B. J. Herman RM
- 1974-1976: Maj. H. O. H. Smith
- 1976-1978: Lt-Cdr D. A. J. Blackburn
- 1978-1980: Sqn Ldr A. A. Nicholson
- 1980-1982: Maj. J. M. V. MacI. Cargin
- 1982-1984: Lt-Cdr A. Wynn
- 1984-1986: Sqn Ldr T. J. Finneron
- 1986-1988: Maj. R. A. F. P. Jackson RM
- 1988-1990: Maj. Sir Guy Acland, Bt
- 1990-1992: Lt Cdr A. C. Sillars
- 1992-1994: Wg-Cdr C. H. Moran
- 1994-1997: Maj. A. C. Richards
- 1997-1999: Lt-Cdr Richard Tarran
- 1999-2001: Sqn Ldr Lynda Johnson
- 2001-2003:Maj. Richard Bennett
- 2003-2005: Lt-Cdr Michael Greenland
- 2005-2006: Sqn Ldr Paul Sanger-Davies
- 2006-2009: Maj. Richard Maundrell
- 2009-2012:Lt-Cdr Adrian Mundin

=== Household of the Prince of Wales and the Duchess of Cornwall ===
The Household of the Prince of Wales and the Duchess of Cornwall was the organised office and support system for Charles, Prince of Wales, and his wife Camilla, Duchess of Cornwall. At the time of their 2009 annual review the Office of the Prince of Wales had the full-time equivalent of 121 staff. The head of the Household was the Principal Private Secretary, Clive Alderton. Senior officials included the Deputy Private Secretary, a senior diplomat seconded from the Foreign & Commonwealth Office to advise The Prince on Foreign and Commonwealth affairs, Scott Furssedonn-Wood; Master of the Household, Earl of Rosslyn; the Treasurer, Andrew Wright; Communications Secretary, Julian Payne; and the Equerry, Commander Iain Kearsley RN.

In 2000, the Prince revived a tradition of having an official harpist, a role last seen under Queen Victoria. The first holder of the office was Catrin Finch, followed in 2004 by Jemima Phillips, and in 2007 by Claire Jones. Following Prince Charles's accession to the throne in 2022, the role has been referred to as King's Harpist.

The Prince of Wales' Office was principally based at Clarence House, London, but also occupied rooms in the rest of St James's Palace. There were also offices for official staff at Highgrove House and Birkhall House, the Prince's private residences.

Most of the expenses incurred in operating the office came from the Prince's private appanage, the Duchy of Cornwall. The only significant costs met by grant-in-aid provided by the Government was for the upkeep of Clarence House, and for official travel by air and rail, and for communications support.

Details of the Prince's Senior Staff were available in his office's annual reports. The following titles all have "to/of The Prince of Wales and The Duchess of Cornwall" suffixed when written in full. Prior to the Prince's 2005 marriage, they were instead suffixed "to/of The Prince of Wales".

==== Principal Private Secretaries ====
- 2005–12 September 2011: Sir Michael Peat
- 12 September 2011 – 2015: William Nye
- 2015–2022 Sir Clive Alderton

==== Private Secretaries ====
- 1970–1978: Sqn Ldr Sir David Checketts
- 1979–1985: Edward Adeane
- Acting 1 April–September 1985 David Roycroft
- September 1985 – 1990: Sir John Riddell, 13th Baronet
- 1990–1991: Maj. Gen. Sir Christopher Airy
- 1991–1996: Cdr Richard Aylard
- 1996–2002: Sir Stephen Lamport
- 2002–2005: Sir Michael Peat
- 2001–2008: Elizabeth Buchanan
- 2005–2011: Manon Williams, Private Secretary for Wales (part-time)
- 2009–: Mark Leishman (as "Senior Deputy Private Secretary" January – July 2009)
- 2009–2012: Clive Alderton, Private Secretary for Foreign and Commonwealth Affairs

==== Masters of the Household ====
- 2005–2006: Kevin Knott
- 2006–2008: Lt Col. Sir Malcolm Ross
- 2008–2014: Wing Cdr Richard Pattle
- 2014–: Cdr Peter St Clair-Erskine, 7th Earl of Rosslyn

==== Deputy Masters of the Household ====
- 2006–2009: Andrew Farquharson

==== Treasurers ====
- –2005: Kevin Knott
- 2005–2012: Leslie Ferrar
- 2012–: Andrew Wright

==== Deputy Private Secretaries ====
- 1986–1988: Col. Humphrey Mews
- 1988–1990: David Wright
- 1990–1993: Sir Peter Westmacott
- 1993–1996: Stephen Lamport
- 1998–2002: Mark Bolland
- 2002–2005: Elizabeth Buchanan
- 2005: James Kidner
- 2005–?: Manon Williams
- 2005–2008: Mark Leishman
- 2006–2008: Clive Alderton
- 2008–2013: Benet Northcote
- 2012–2014: Simon Martin
- 2014–2017: Jamie Bowden
- 2017–: Scott Furssedonn-Wood

==== Assistant Private Secretaries ====
- 1994–1998: Manon Williams
- 2000–2003: Nigel Baker
- 2002–2005: Paul Kefford
- 2003–2005: James Kidner
- 2003–2005: Mark Leishman
- 2004–2005: Manon Williams
- 2005–: Joy Camm & Amanda MacManus (each part-time)
- 2005–2007: Katy Golding
- 2006–: Jonathan Hellewell
- 2006–2008: Anita Kumar
- 2008–: Sophie Densham
- 2008: Shilpa Sinha
- ?–2011: Sarah Kennedy-Good
- 2011–2013: Joshua Puls
- 2013–2015: Craig Kowalik
- ?–*: Emily Cherrington
- 2015–2017: Melissa Hayden-Clarke
- 2017–2019: Bernadette Smith
- 2019–2022: Jennifer Jordan-Saifi
- 2020–2022: Claire Saunders

==== Equerries ====
- 1970–1972: Lt Nicholas Soames, 11th Hussars
- c.1971: Lt David Wilson
- 1972–: Lt Gilbert Kerruish, Royal Regiment of Wales
- 1976–1978 Capt. T P G N Ward Welsh Guards
- c.1976–1977: Capt. Alun Davies, Royal Regiment of Wales
- 1977–: Capt. Christopher Elliott, Royal Regiment of Wales
- c.1979: Capt. Anthony Asquith, Royal Regiment of Wales
- –1982: Maj. Quentin Winter, Parachute Regiment
- 1982–1984: Maj. David Bromhead
- 1984–1986: Maj. Jack Stenhouse
- 1986–1987: Lt Col. Brian Anderson
- 1987–1989: Maj. Christopher Lavender
- 1989–1991: Cdr Alastair Watson
- 1991–1994: Lt Cdr Robert Fraser
- 1994–1996: Maj. Patrick Tabor
- 1996–1999: Lt Cdr John Lavery
- 1999–2002: Lt Cdr William Entwisle
- 2002–2004: Lt Cdr Alastair Graham
- 2003–2004: Maj. Rupert Lendrum (Senior Equerry)
- 2004–2006: Wing Cdr Richard Pattle, RAF
- 2006–2008: Sqn Ldr Jayne Casebury, RAF
- 2008–2011: Maj. Will Mackinlay Royal Scots Dragoon Guards
- 2011–2013: Maj. Peter Flynn, Parachute Regiment
- 2013–2015: Maj. David Bevan, Welsh Guards
- 2015–2018: Maj. Harry Pilcher, Queen's Dragoon Guards
- 2018–2020: Cdr. Iain Kearsley, Royal Navy
- 2020–2022: Lieutenant Colonel Jonathan Thompson, Royal Regiment of Scotland

==== Assistant Masters of the Household ====
- 2007–: Virginia Carington
  - as "Special Assistant" until 2007
  - as "Assistant Master of the Household" since 2007

==== Communications Secretary ====
- 2016–2021: Julian Payne
- 2021–2022: Simon Enright
- 2022: Tobyn Andreae

=== Household of the Duke and Duchess of Sussex ===
In 2013, it was announced that Prince Harry had appointed former Household Cavalry captain, Edward Lane Fox, as his private secretary effective July 2013.

In March 2019, it was announced that the Duke and Duchess of Sussex would establish a new household for themselves, following the birth of their child in spring as well as the move of their official residence to Frogmore Cottage, with their office set to be located at Buckingham Palace. Following the decision to step back from royal duties, it was announced in February 2020 that they would close their office at Buckingham Palace.

==== List of Household staff ====
Private Secretary to the Duke of Sussex

- 2013–2018: Edward Lane Fox

Private Secretary to the Duke and Duchess of Sussex

- 2018–2019: Samantha Cohen
- 2019–2020: Fiona Mcilwham

Deputy Private Secretary to the Duke and Duchess of Sussex

- 2019–2020: Heather Wong

Assistant Private Secretary to the Duke of Sussex

- 2019–2020: Robert Reader

Assistant Private Secretary to the Duchess of Sussex

- 2018–2019: Amy Pickerill

Personal Assistant to the Duchess of Sussex

- 2018: Melissa Touabti

Communication Secretary to the Duke and Duchess of Sussex

- 2019–2020: Sara Latham

Assistant Communication Secretary to the Duke and Duchess of Sussex

- 2018: Katrina McKeever
- Marnie Gaffney

Projects Manager to the Duke and Duchess of Sussex

- 2018–2020: Clara Madden

Digital Communications Lead to the Duke and Duchess of Sussex

- 2019–2020: David Watkins

=== Household of the Duke of York ===
The Household of the Duke of York provided administrative support for the royal duties of Prince Andrew, Duke of York, along with his immediate family. From 1971, Prince Andrew (then aged 11 years), had the assistance of one of the Queen's equerries when required. The first was Sqn Ldr Peter Beer, who served until he was replaced by Maj. George Broke Royal Artillery in 1974, and Lt Cdr Robert Guy RN in 1977.

It was only with the appointment in 1980 of Sqn Ldr Adam Wise, that the Prince could be said to have acquired the assistance of his own staff – although he was still shared with the Queen and Prince Edward. In 1983, Wise was promoted to wing commander and appointed Private Secretary to Princes Andrew and Edward, severing his link with The Royal Household. He left the Duke of York's service in 1987, when Lt Col. Sean O'Dwyer was appointed – also jointly with Prince Edward.

The Duke of York was assisted by a private secretary, deputy private secretary, assistant private secretary and equerry. There were an office assistant, and a handful of personal staff including cook and butler. The Duke of York's office was based at Buckingham Palace, and the Duke has a residence at Royal Lodge, Windsor, into which he moved during 2004, from Sunninghill Park, Ascot.

In December 2022, it was reported that as a non-working member of the royal family he would no longer have an office at Buckingham Palace.

==== Private Secretaries to the Duke of York ====
- 1983–1987: Wg Cdr Adam Wise
- 1987–1990: Lt Col. Sean O'Dwyer Irish Guards (Retd.)
- 1990–2001: Capt. Neil Blair
- 2001–2003: Cdr Charlotte Manley
- 2003–2012: Maj. Alastair Watson
- 2012–2020: Amanda Thirsk

==== Assistant Private Secretaries to the Duke of York ====
- ?–present: James Upsher

==== Equerry to the Duke of York ====
- 2014-2017: Lieutenant Jack Cooper, RN
- 2017–2019: Captain Edward Monckton
- 2019–: Lieutenant Commander Alex Davies, RN

== See also ==
- Court of St James's – Official royal court of the British Monarch
- Finances of the British royal family – UK monarchy's income and spending
- Funeral directors to the Royal Household – UK undertaking businesses
- Monarchy of Canada § Federal residences and royal household
- Royal Household Long and Faithful Service Medal – Civil decoration awarded by the British monarch
