= Caereinion High School =

- Ysgol Uwchradd Caereinion

Location
- Llanfair Caereinion, Powys, SY21 0HW; Wales; 52.6500°N 3.3282°W

Information
- Type: Community school
- Motto: Welsh: Golud Pawb ei Ymgais (One's effort is one's reward)
- Established: 1894
- Closed: 2022
- Local authority: Powys County Council
- Department for Education URN: 401721 Tables
- Head teacher: Philip Jones
- Gender: Mixed
- Age range: 11–18
- Enrolment: 485 (2021)
- Language: Bilingual
- Colours: Blue and yellow
- Website: caer-hs.powys.sch.uk

Caereinion High School (Welsh: Ysgol Uwchradd Caereinion) is an 11–18 mixed, bilingual community secondary school and sixth form in Llanfair Caereinion, Powys, Wales. It was established in 1894.

Spanish and French are offered up to A-Level, and A-Level students are also given the option of learning either Italian, German, Russian or Mandarin through the Welsh Baccalaureate Qualification scheme, a qualification which is designed to enhance Welsh pupils' key skills and appreciation of the country's heritage and history.

54% of the pupils are fluent Welsh speakers according to the latest Estyn inspection report.

The school closed in August 2022 and reopened as Ysgol Bro Caereinion, a new 3-18 school.

== Academics ==
The school has excelled in examination results, both at GCSE and A-Level. In the inspection, it was noted that the school possessed a number of "outstanding features", including support for those with difficulty of learning.

Caereinion High School achieved all Grade 2 attributes, bar one category which was given a Grade 3.

The school includes a 5×60 officer. 5×60 is a scheme designed for schools in the country to encourage young people to take part in 60 minutes of physical activity daily. Next door to the school is the town's leisure centre, consisting of squash courts, a fitness suite, a gymnasium and a sports hall. The school has a sound relationship with the centre's management, and pupils use the centre's facilities for PE lessons, as well as for extra-curricular activities during the lunch hour and after school.

The school has had great success at the annual Urdd Eisteddfod, a competitive cultural event which encompasses literature and music performances, in choral, orchestral, and recitation competitions.

== Sports ==
Sport has become a prominent feature of the school's face. The under-18 boys' team won the Welsh School's Minute Maid Cup in 2009 (the school winning 4-1 on penalties). The team that was victorious starred two young men who went on to be capped for Welsh School's under 18s; Steffan Jones and Ross Frame, both of Llanfair Caereinion, enjoyed subsequent successes on the international level.

Katie Griffiths has gone on to represent Wales in hockey and football, while Huw Jones enjoys a so far successful international career in table tennis, and Aled Humphreys competes in bowls. Catrin Thomas has displayed outstanding achievements in the field of athletics, winning several gold and silver medals. James Harding represented the North Wales rugby team at the under 18s level.

== Collaboration ==
The school collaborates with the nearby Llanfyllin High School and Welshpool High School in the Trisgol partnership. This involves the sharing of A-level courses with the aim of increasing the number of courses on offer. A number of sixth-form students travel to the other schools for particular courses, as well as students from the other schools travelling to Caereinion. Students at the school also travel to NPTC's Newtown campus to access vocational courses.

== Notable former pupils and teaching staff ==
- Ryan Astley, footballer who has played for Everton FC, Accrington Stanley and Scottish team Dundee
- Shân Cothi (born 1965), singer-songwriter, television and Welsh radio presenter who began her teaching career as Head of Music
- Glyn Davies (born 1944), Conservative MP for Montgomeryshire 2010–2019
- Alis Huws (born 1995), Official Harpist to the Prince of Wales
- Siân James (musician) (born 1961), Welsh traditional folk singer and harpist
- Helen Mary Jones (born 1960), deputy leader of Plaid Cymru 2008–2012
- Trefor Owen (born 1933), Welsh amateur footballer who played in the Football League for Leyton Orient as a centre half
- Kingsley Whiffen, football player who played for Chelsea in the 1960s
