= Robert Braybrooke =

14th-century Bishop of London and Chancellor of England

- Bishop of London
- Tomb slab of Bishop Robert Braybrooke in Old St Paul's Cathedral, destroyed in the Great Fire.
- Appointed: 9 September 1381
- Term ended: 28 August 1404
- Predecessor: William Courtenay
- Successor: Roger Walden

Orders
- Consecration: 5 January 1382

Personal details
- Died: 28 August 1404
- Denomination: Catholic

Robert Braybrooke (1336/7-1404) was a medieval cleric and King's Secretary. He was Dean of Salisbury and Bishop of London.

== Biography ==
Braybrooke was the son of Sir Gerard de Braybooke of Castle Ashby, MP for Northampton of Horsenden, Buckinghamshire & Colmworth, Bedfordshire and his wife, Isabella, the daughter of Sir Roger Dakeny of Clophill.

=== King's Secretary ===
Braybrooke was a trained lawyer who became the first keeper of the King' signet ring on the accession of the ten-year-old Richard II to the English throne in July 1377. Braybrooke thus became the first King's Secretary using this signet ring. Whereas the Great Seal had been used to endorse the documentation of the royal pardons Richard II offered the peasant rebels when he met them at Mile End to diffuse the Peasants' Revolt shortly before his coronation. Despite bearing the imprint of the Great Seal, these pardons were withdrawn. During the few years in which Braybrooke was the King's Secretary, most of the documents endorsed by the King's Signet Ring, most were later further endorsed by the Privy Seal, before being issued with the Great Seal in Chancery.

He was nominated 9 September 1381 and consecrated on 5 January 1382.

Braybrooke was named Lord Chancellor of England on 20 September 1382 and was out of the office by 11 July 1383.

Braybrooke accompanied Richard II to Ireland in 1394 and was Lord Chancellor of Ireland for six months in 1397.

Braybrooke died on 28 August 1404, and was buried in St. Paul's Cathedral. His tomb was smashed during the Great Fire of London in 1666, and his body was found inside intact and mummified.

== See also ==
- Secretary of State (England)
- List of lord chancellors and lord keepers

== Citations ==
Political offices
Preceded by William Trussel	King's Secretary; 1377–1381	Succeeded by John Bacon of Brome
Preceded by Richard Scrope	Lord Chancellor; 1382–1383	Succeeded by Michael de la Pole
Catholic Church titles
Preceded by William Courtenay	Bishop of London; 1381–1404	Succeeded by Roger Walden
