= Claire Jones =

Welsh harpist

Claire Jones (born in 1985) is a Welsh harpist who held the title of Official Harpist to the Prince of Wales from 2007 to 2011.

== Career ==
Jones began playing the harp at the age of 10; she performed for the Queen and Duke of Edinburgh when she was 16. In 2007, she was one of the inaugural winners of The Prince of Wales’s Advanced Study in Music Award, and was appointed as the Prince's official harpist for a 3-year term. During the previous year, she had won the harp solo at the National Eisteddfod of Wales, been a finalist at the Third International Harp Contest in France, and won the Royal College of Music Harp Competition. She performed at the wedding of Prince William and Catherine Middleton in 2011 and is an ambassador for The Prince's Foundation for Children and The Arts.

=== Selection of recordings ===
- Touching Gold, Kissan Productions, 2008
- Harp Concertos, Signum Records, 2010
- Highgrove Suite, Classic FM, 2010
- The Girl with the Golden Harp, Classic FM, 2012.
- Live at Classic FM: Sir James Galway & Claire Jones, Global Radio, 2013
- Journey: Harp to soothe the soul, Silva Screen Records (under licence from Marshall Jones Music), 2015

== Personal life ==
Jones was born in Crymych, Pembrokeshire and attended school there. In 2012, at Blaenffos Chapel, Pembrokeshire, she married musician Chris Marshall, whom she had met at the Royal Academy of Music. Jones was diagnosed with ME in 2013. Together with her husband she founded the Claire Jones Concert Ensemble from student and professional harpists.

Court offices
Preceded by Jemima Phillips	Official Harpist to the Prince of Wales; 2007–2011	Succeeded by Hannah Stone
