= Brian McGrath =

Sir Brian McGrath
- Born: Brian Henry McGrath; 27 October 1925
- Died: 4 June 2016 (aged 90)
- Education: Eton College
- Military career
- Allegiance: United Kingdom
- Branch: British Army
- Unit: Irish Guards
- Conflicts: Second World War

Sir Brian Henry McGrath, GCVO, MW (27 October 1925 – 4 June 2016) was the Private Secretary to the Duke of Edinburgh.

He was educated at Eton College. From 1943 to 1946, he served in the Irish Guards, and after World War II, he joined Cannon Brewery from 1946 to 1948. In 1948, he went to Victoria Wine Ltd, of which he became a director in 1949, and was chairman from 1960 to 1982. He was a Master of Wine.

McGrath also held various directorships, including Grants of St James Ltd 1960 (chairman 1975–1982), Allied Breweries Ltd (now Allied-Lyon Plc) 1970–1982, and Broad Street Securities Ltd (chairman 1983–1991). In 1982 he joined the Office of the Duke of Edinburgh as Assistant Private Secretary, being promoted to Private Secretary and Treasurer in 1984. In 1992 he ceased to be Private Secretary, and from 1993 to 1995 was Head of the Household. He retired as Treasurer in 1995, and in the following year was appointed Extra Equerry. He died on 4 June 2016, aged 90.

== Honours ==
McGrath was made a CVO in 1988, and advanced to KCVO in 1993, and GCVO in 2001.

He was a Younger Brother of the Corporation of Trinity House from 1993.

Coat of arms of Brian McGrath

Notes
Displayed on a stall plate in the King's Chapel of the Savoy.
Motto
Salus In Fide
