= Alis Huws =

Welsh harpist

- Born: 2 April 1995 (age 30)
- Origin: Powys, Wales
- Genres: Classical; Contemporary Classical; Harp
- Occupation: Harpist
- Website: Alis Huws

Alis Huws is a Welsh harpist from Powys and former Official Harpist to the Prince of Wales from 2019 to 2024.

== Education ==
Huws is from Foel near Llanfair Caereinion in Powys, where she attended Ysgol Uwchradd Caereinion. Having received harp lessons at school, she continued her studies at the Royal Welsh College of Music and Drama in Cardiff, where she has since graduated with both undergraduate and master's degrees. Whilst there, she was awarded the Midori Matsui Prize for music, the Royal Welch Fusiliers Harp Prize and the McGrennery Chamber Music Prize.

Huws was a member of the National Youth Orchestra of Wales and in 2016 was principal harp in the WNO Youth Opera production of Kommilitonen! by Peter Maxwell Davies.

== Career ==
In 2017 Huws performed alongside Katherine Jenkins and Only Men Aloud at an event celebrating the UEFA Champions League Final in Cardiff.

Having performed for the Royal Family on several occasions, Huws was appointed the Official Harpist to the Prince of Wales in July 2019. Following the accession of Charles III in September 2022, Huws' role became that of Royal Harpist, and in February 2023 she was chosen to play at Charles' coronation.

Court offices
Preceded by Anne Denholm	Official Harpist to the Prince of Wales; 2019–2024	Succeeded by Mared Emyr Pugh-Evans
