= Humphrey Mews =

Colonel Humphrey Mews (1941–1990) was Deputy Private Secretary to the Prince of Wales between 1986 and 1988.

Mews joined the Royal Artillery after Sandhurst. After Sandhurst, he was posted as a 2nd Lieutenant to 22 (Gibraltar 1779–83) Battery, Royal Artillery as officer in charge of "B" Troop Radar Section, taking over from 2/Lt Grant Paton of Largs. In 1963 he was posted to Malaya as part of 2 Troop RA, an independent locating troop, equipped with the new Green Archer mortar locating radars. The OC of this unit was Captain Shallcross who retired after a short period in Malaysia. Humphrey Mews was promoted to captain and became OC 2 Troop RA. He saw active service in Borneo in 1965 when 2 radar sections from 2 Troop were deployed in Sarawak on the border with Indonesia during the armed confrontation between Malaysia and Indonesia. The unit returned to the UK in 1966.

In 1969–1971 he was Troop Captain of the King's Troop, Royal Horse Artillery, and from 1978 to 1980 was Commanding Officer of the 1st Regiment Royal Horse Artillery.

Colonel Mews was appointed to the Office of the Prince of Wales after serving as Colonel Cabinet Office, in the foreign and defence secretariat of the Cabinet Office between 1984 and 1986.

Mews was a proficient horse rider. During a team chase where he fell at a fence and broke his leg, he is reported to have shouted to his team mates 'Carry on chaps, it's only a broken leg'.
