= Elinor Bennett =

Welsh harpist (born 1943)

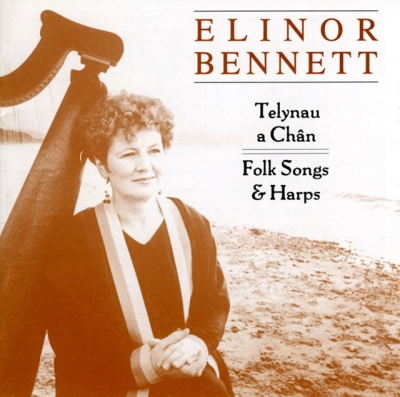
Album cover (1991)

Elinor Bennett, Baroness Wigley, OBE (born 17 April 1943) is a Welsh harpist who has an international reputation as a soloist, master instructor, and founded the Harp College of Wales.

== Biography ==
Bennett was born in 1943 in Llanidloes, Wales. When she was six, her family moved into a house known as Gwyndy on the White Hall estate of Owen Morgan Edwards at Llanuwchllyn near Bala. She was a student at the local primary school and then attended the Bala Girls' Grammar School. Her father bought Bennett her first harp when she was six, though she did not begin lessons until age 11. Upon graduation from high school, Bennett studied law at University College Wales, Aberystwyth and after completing a Bachelor of Laws, she moved to London, where she was employed in a law office. Wanting to continue her education, she applied for and won a scholarship to attend the Royal Academy of Music, studying with Osian Ellis. Graduating three years later, she later completed music therapy courses in Australia.

Bennett's debut was at Wigmore Hall, London and then she worked from 1967 to 1971 as a freelance artist playing with the English Chamber Orchestra, London Symphony Orchestra, and the Philharmonia Orchestra. She has performed many recitals on BBC Radio 3 and BBC television. Though known most for classical music, Bennett has also played with some of Wales' most renowned figures from rock music. She has recorded twelve solo albums, and is one of the organisers of the Wales International Harp Festival. She founded the Coleg Telyn Cymru (Harp College of Wales) and is known for her instruction. Her students have included Catrin Finch, who later married her son Hywel.

In 1996, Bennett was made an Honorary Fellow at her alma mater in Aberystwyth; and in 2002 she received the White Robe of the National Eisteddfod of Wales, the festival's highest honour. She was the recipient of the Glyndŵr Award in 2003 and in 2006, she was honoured for her service to Wales with her music, receiving the Order of the British Empire. She published Tannau Tynion, her autobiography in 2011.

== Family ==
Bennett married the Plaid Cymru politician, Dafydd Wigley, later Baron Wigley, in 1967. Two of the couple's four children predeceased their parents, dying from an inherited genetic condition, Sanfilippo syndrome.
