= Anne Denholm =

Welsh harpist

- Born: 29 July 1991 (age 35)
- Origin: Carmarthen, Wales
- Genres: Classical; Contemporary Classical; Harp
- Occupation: Harpist
- Website: Anne Denholm

Anne Denholm is a Welsh harpist born in Carmarthenshire, who held the position of Official Harpist to the Prince of Wales from 2015 to 2019.

== Education ==
Denholm was educated at Ysgol Gynradd y Dderwen and Ysgol Gyfun Gymraeg Bro Myrddin. She then went on to study at the Junior Department of the Royal Welsh College of Music & Drama, the Purcell School and Newnham College, Cambridge.

Denholm received her Master's in 2015 from the Royal Academy of Music (RAM) with distinction, graduating with the Renata Scheffel-Stein Harp Prize, the Sir Reginald Thatcher prize and a Regency Award for notable achievement. Whilst at the Royal Academy, she was the first harpist to win the historic RAM Club Prize, twice winner of the Skaila Kanga Harp Prize, and holder of a Headley Trust Award and the John Thomas Scholarship.

== Career ==
In July 2015 she was appointed Official Harpist to His Royal Highness The Prince of Wales, the fifth artist to hold this position since its reinstatement in 2000.

Denholm is a founding member of contemporary quartet, The Hermes Experiment, who regularly commission new works and arrangements for their idiosyncratic combination of instruments (clarinet, soprano voice, harp and double bass), as well as performing live free improvisation.

On 19 May 2018, Denholm performed at the wedding of Prince Harry and Meghan Markle.

Court offices
Preceded by Hannah Stone	Official Harpist to the Prince of Wales; 2015–2019	Succeeded by Alis Huws
