= Hannah Stone =

Welsh harpist

Hannah Stone, Lady Terfel
- Born: Hannah Stone; 1987 (age 38–39)
- Origin: Treboeth, Swansea, Wales
- Genres: Classical
- Occupation: Harpist
- Years active: 2011–present

Hannah Stone (born 1987) is a professional Welsh harpist.

Since 2007 she has performed internationally and won a number of prizes, and from 2011 to 2015 was Official Harpist to the Prince of Wales.

== Education ==
Stone graduated with a Bachelor of Music degree from the Guildhall School of Music & Drama. As part of an exchange programme, she studied at the Universität Mozarteum, Salzburg, under Professor Helga Storck. In 2010 she furthered her studies at Royal Welsh College of Music & Drama (RWCMD), Cardiff, where she graduated in 2012 with a Master of Arts.

== Career ==
Hannah Stone began performing at the age of 8. When she was 15, she played for The Queen on Her Majesty's Jubilee Tour of Wales in 2002, and has played for the Royal Family on several other occasions.

In October 2008, Stone was selected to represent the Guildhall School in collaboration with the Academies Festival Orchestra, Singapore. This project culminated in an opening gala performance for the Singapore Sun Festival at the Esplanade Theatre with Dame Kiri te Kanawa. In 2008 she was awarded the third prize at the Camac Harp Competition, London, and won the first prize at the National Eisteddfod, Cardiff.

During 2010 Stone was awarded the 3rd prize at the International Harp Competition in Caernarfon and 2nd prize at the Franz Joseph Reinl Competition in Vienna. She was also appointed principal harpist with the Schleswig Holstein Festival Orchestra for 2010.

In June 2011 Stone was appointed the Official Harpist to the Prince of Wales.

Hannah Stone performed at the NATO Conference Dinner at Cardiff Castle in 2014 to delegates including US President Barack Obama, German Chancellor Angela Merkel and UK Prime Minister David Cameron.

== Personal life ==
Stone was born in Swansea and grew up in Treboeth and Mumbles. She married singer Gary Griffiths in the early 2010s, but after two years the couple split up.

In 2017 she had a daughter by Sir Bryn Terfel, whom she married on 26 July 2019 at Caersalem Newydd Baptist Church in Swansea.

Court offices
Preceded by Claire Jones	Official Harpist to the Prince of Wales; 2011–2015	Succeeded by Anne Denholm
