= Elizabeth Buchanan =

Former Private Secretary to the Prince of Wales

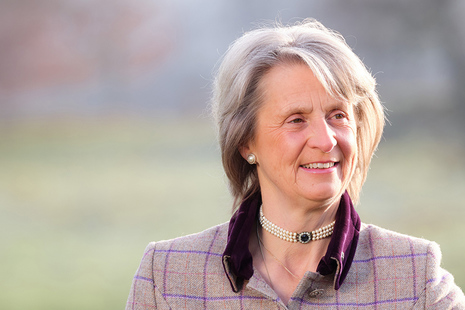
Elizabeth Buchanan

Elizabeth Faith Currer Buchanan, CVO (born 1962) was formerly Private Secretary to the Prince of Wales (now King Charles III).

== Biography ==
Buchanan worked in public relations. She was a spokeswoman for the United Kingdom Prime Minister Margaret Thatcher and a political adviser to Cecil Parkinson and Paul Channon at the Department of Transport.

She then worked for a public relations firm run by Timothy Bell, from which she was assigned in 1998 on a two-year secondment to the Office of the Prince of Wales as Assistant Private Secretary (with specific responsibility for rural matters). She stayed in this position until 2002, when she was appointed Deputy Private Secretary. She was made Private Secretary to The Prince in 2005, serving until late 2008.

Already a Lieutenant of the Royal Victorian Order (LVO), Buchanan was appointed Commander of the Royal Victorian Order (CVO) in the 2009 New Year Honours.

Buchanan is currently a Special Adviser to Waitrose, Saputo Dairy UK and McDonald's, and a special adviser to Chime, a communications agency. She is also a consultant to Nyetimber.

On 1 April 2023, she joined the board of NFU Mutual as a non-executive director, however, she resigned just over 6 months later.

Buchanan was appointed a Deputy Lieutenant of East Sussex in March 2026.
