= Adam Wise =

RAF officer (1943–2008)

Adam Wise LVO MBE
- Born: 1 August 1943; London, England
- Died: 14 February 2008 (aged 64); Winchester, England
- Spouse: Jill Amabel (nee Alington)
- Relatives: Roy Wise (father)
- Military career
- Allegiance: United Kingdom
- Branch: Royal Air Force
- Service years: 1964–1998
- Rank: Group Captain
- Service number: 2617194
- Commands: RAF Benson; University of Wales Air Squadron
- Awards: Lieutenant of the Royal Victorian Order; Member of the Order of the British Empire

Group Captain Adam Nugent Wise, LVO, MBE (1 August 1943 – 14 February 2008) was a pilot, Equerry to Queen Elizabeth II, and Private Secretary and Equerry to Prince Andrew and Prince Edward from 1983 to 1987.

== Early life ==
Born on 1 August 1943, Wise was the son of Conservative MP Roy Wise. He was educated at university (receiving a Bachelor of Arts), and the RAF College Cranwell from late 1964.

== Royal Air Force service ==
Wise was a flight cadet at RAF Cranwell when he was commissioned pilot officer on 17 December 1965. He qualified as a pilot and was promoted to flying officer on 17 June 1966, and then flight lieutenant on 1 July 1968. He served with No. 21 Squadron RAF flying from RAF Khormaksar until 1968. He was appointed a Member of the Order of the British Empire in January 1977.

Wise qualified as a First Class Interpreter, and attended the Joint Service Defence College. He was promoted squadron leader on 1 January 1978, and posted to command the University of Wales Air Squadron until 1983, flying Scottish Aviation Bulldogs.

As a squadron leader, Wise was Equerry to The Queen from 1980 to 21 October 1983. Following his service, he was appointed a Lieutenant of the Royal Victorian Order in October 1983. He was then appointed Private Secretary and Equerry to Prince Andrew and Prince Edward from 21 October 1983, until 1 August 1987. On 1 July 1984 he was promoted to wing commander.

On 16 December 1983 he married Jill Amabel Alington, daughter of Cyril Geoffrey Marmaduke Alington of Swinhope (in West Lindsey, Lincolnshire), and Helen Amabel née Westmacott, with whom he had two children, Sophia Katherine Cassandra and Alexander Geoffrey Roy.

From 30 March 1988 he was on the staff of the RAF College, Cranwell, and on 17 November 1989 he became Director of the University Air Squadrons. He was promoted to group captain on 1 July 1990, and was Station Commander of RAF Benson from 1992 to 1994. On 18 November 1991, he was appointed Aide-de-Camp to The Queen a role he fulfilled until 10 December 1993.

He served as a company director at 16 SUTHERLAND STREET LIMITED from 31 January 1992 to 14 February 2008.

Wise served as Military and Air Attaché at the British Embassy in Madrid, Spain, from 1993 to 1997 and retired on 1 August 1998.

== Later years ==
Wise died on 14 February 2008 at Royal Hampshire County Hospital.
