= Jemima Phillips =

Welsh harpist

- Born: North London, England
- Occupation: Musician
- Instrument(s): Harp, violin, piano
- Website: jemimaphillips.co.uk

Jemima Phillips is an English-born Welsh harpist. She was the Official Harpist to the Prince of Wales from 2004 to 2007 but was later convicted of handling stolen goods.

== Biography ==
Phillips was born in North London, where her father Robert was an arboriculturist in the London Borough of Camden; her mother, Jenny, was an actress. Jemima's younger brother Jerome, one year her junior was physically and mentally disabled (he died when she was aged 14); and younger sister Genevieve was severely autistic.

The family moved to a farm in Gloucestershire when Phillips was seven, and from the age of nine she was raised in Ebbw Vale and Monmouth, Wales.

Phillips played Suzuki violin from aged three, and piano from aged four. She started playing the harp from the age of 9, Phillips was a semi-finalist in the BBC's Young Musician of the Year competition. She attended Haberdashers' Monmouth School for Girls and the Royal College of Music, London.

=== Career ===
Phillips was appointed Official Harpist to Prince Charles in 2004, replacing Catrin Finch. Phillips was the only musician to play at the wedding reception of the Prince of Wales and the Duchess of Cornwall, performed at the wedding of Autumn Kelly and the Queen's eldest grandchild, Peter Phillips; and featured in the first concert to be recorded in the ballroom of Buckingham Palace. During her tenure as Official Harpist to the Prince of Wales, she performed at the reception hosted by Her Majesty the Queen for the London bid for the 2012 Summer Olympics. In 2007 Claire Jones from Pembrokeshire took over the role.

=== Personal life ===
Presently living in St Briavels in Forest of Dean, Gloucestershire, Phillips teaches and plays harp professionally.

In June 2009, Phillips and former boyfriend William Davies, 40, were brought in front of Cheltenham magistrates with three charges of house burglary on three houses allegedly committed throughout May, and a fourth count of fraud by false representation. Her subsequent trial was halted on 22 October when Judge Michael Harington told the jury at Gloucester Crown Court they were being discharged for reasons that were not explained. The trial restarted on 30 November; on 2 December, Phillips in her evidence confessed to being a heroin addict, and said she had been addicted to heroin and cocaine during her time as Royal Harpist. Having admitted one count of attempted fraud, Phillips was found guilty of handling stolen goods on 7 December 2009. Phillips was given a 12-month Community order and sent for drug rehabilitation.

Court offices
Preceded by Catrin Finch	Official Harpist to the Prince of Wales; 2004–2007	Succeeded by Claire Jones
