= King's Secretary =

The King's Secretary was an administrative role that developed in England in the Middle Ages as the monarchy developed in complexity.

== King's signet ring ==
Robert Braybrooke was the first King's Secretary with the use of the king's signet ring, upon the accession of the ten-year-old Richard II to the English throne in July 1377.
