= Mared Pugh Evans =

Welsh harpist

Mared Emyr Pugh Evans is a Welsh harpist. She is the seventh Official Harpist to the Prince of Wales, now referred to as the King's Harpist.

== Education ==
Pugh Evans began taking harp lessons at age six.

Pugh Evans began attending the Royal Welsh College of Music & Drama in 2016, graduating in 2020. While at the college, she won the 2019 RWCMD Mansel Thomas Prize, the 2019 RWCMD McGrenery Prize for Chamber Music, and the 2020 Sir Ian Stoutzker Prize for most outstanding instrumentalist. She completed her final exams remotely due to the COVID-19 pandemic. She then attended the Royal Academy of Music, graduating in 2022 with a master's degree in performance.

== Career ==
In 2018, Pugh Evans was one of three winners of the Youth Competition at the Wales International Harp Festival. In 2019, Pugh Evans won a £1,500 scholarship from the Nansi Richards Scholarship competition. That same year, she was the runner-up at the North London Festival Camac Harp Competition. At the 2022 USA International Harp Competition, she took sixth place.

Pugh Evans co-founded, with Joseph Cavalli-Price, the charity Music in Hospices while pursuing her degree at the Royal Academy of Music. The charity provides live music in hospice facilities. From September 2022 to July 2023, Pugh Evans was an Open Academy Fellow.

Pugh Evans was named as the King's Harpist in July 2024. Her first official performance in the role was on 11 July, on the occasion of the King and Queen's visit to the Senedd.

As of 2024, she lives in London, where she works with organizations such as the City of London Sinfonia, Live Music Now, and Wigmore Hall’s Music for Life. She has previously performed with London Concert Orchestra and the Royal Philharmonic Concert Orchestra.

Court offices
Preceded by Alis Huws	King's Harpist; 2024–present	Succeeded by incumbent

== Personal life ==
Pugh Evans speaks Welsh fluently.
