= Catrin Finch =

Welsh harpist

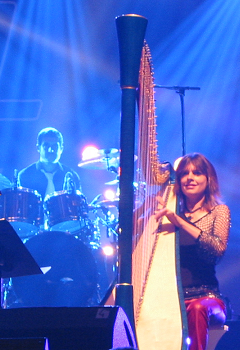
Finch on stage at Lorient, Brittany in 2008

Catrin Ana Finch is a Welsh harpist, arranger and composer. She was the Official Harpist to the Prince of Wales from 2000 to 2004 and is visiting professor at the Royal Welsh College of Music & Drama and the Royal Academy of Music in London. Finch has given recitals at venues throughout the world.

== Early life ==
Catrin Finch was born in Llanon, Ceredigion, and began learning the harp at the age of six. Her mother is German and her father English, and she is a fluent Welsh speaker. By the age of nine, she had passed her grade VIII harp examination. She was a member of the National Youth Orchestra of Great Britain at the age of ten, becoming the youngest of its members to play at The Proms. She studied harp with Elinor Bennett, who would become her mother-in-law, before attending the Purcell School, a specialist music school for children in Hertfordshire. She continued her studies at the Royal Academy of Music in London where she studied harp with Skaila Kanga.

During the 1990s, Finch won several competitions for young harpists, including the Nansi Richards Prize and the Blue Riband at the National Eisteddfod of Wales.

== Career ==
Finch's award-winning musical career began in 1999, when she won the Lily Laskine International Harp Competition in France. In 2000, she won the Young Concert Artists International Auditions in New York City, subsequently performing at London's Wigmore Hall. She was later appointed Official Harpist to the Prince of Wales, an office reinstated by Prince Charles and which had been vacant since the reign of Queen Victoria. She continued in the post from 2000 to 2004.

In 2003, Finch presented Charlie’s Angel, an award-winning television documentary about her career, broadcast on BBC Wales.

In recognition of her musical achievements, Finch has been awarded with several academic honours starting with an honorary fellowship from the University of Wales in 2006, as well as honorary fellowships from the University of Wales and the Royal Welsh College of Music & Drama in 2005. She is a visiting professor at the Royal Welsh College of Music and Drama and the Royal Academy of Music.

In 2010, Finch appeared as part of the BBC children's television series ZingZillas, performing a lullaby composed by Chris Banks and Wag Marshall-Page entitled "Drift Away", alongside the other members of the ZingZillas band. The performance was used in series 1, episode 10 of the show, entitled "Sweet Dreams".

2011 saw Finch produce the album Annwn where she arranged, performed and for the first time provided vocals on a number of tracks influenced by Welsh mythology, an interest of hers since she was young. Featuring a collection of traditional Welsh music, many tracks are newly arranged by Finch in a contemporary style, borrowing from jazz as well as electronic ambient music. The album title refers to Annwn, the Otherworld in Welsh mythology.

In 2015, Finch toured Patagonia with the BBC National Orchestra of Wales, taking her family with her.

In 2016, Finch performed on the recording of Cantata Memoria by Karl Jenkins, a choral with orchestra piece dedicated to the children who perished in the 1966 Aberfan disaster. The haunting music contains the hymn All Things Bright and Beautiful and also features vocals from Bryn Terfel. The piece premiered at the Aberfan Memorial Concert at the Wales Millennium Centre which also featured spoken-word pieces from Michael Sheen and Sian Phillips. Finch's composition Future Strings from the album Clychau Dibon, which she had written with Seckou Keita, was sampled by Guy Chambers, long-term songwriter to Robbie Williams who heard it played on Desert Island Discs program on BBC Radio 4 .

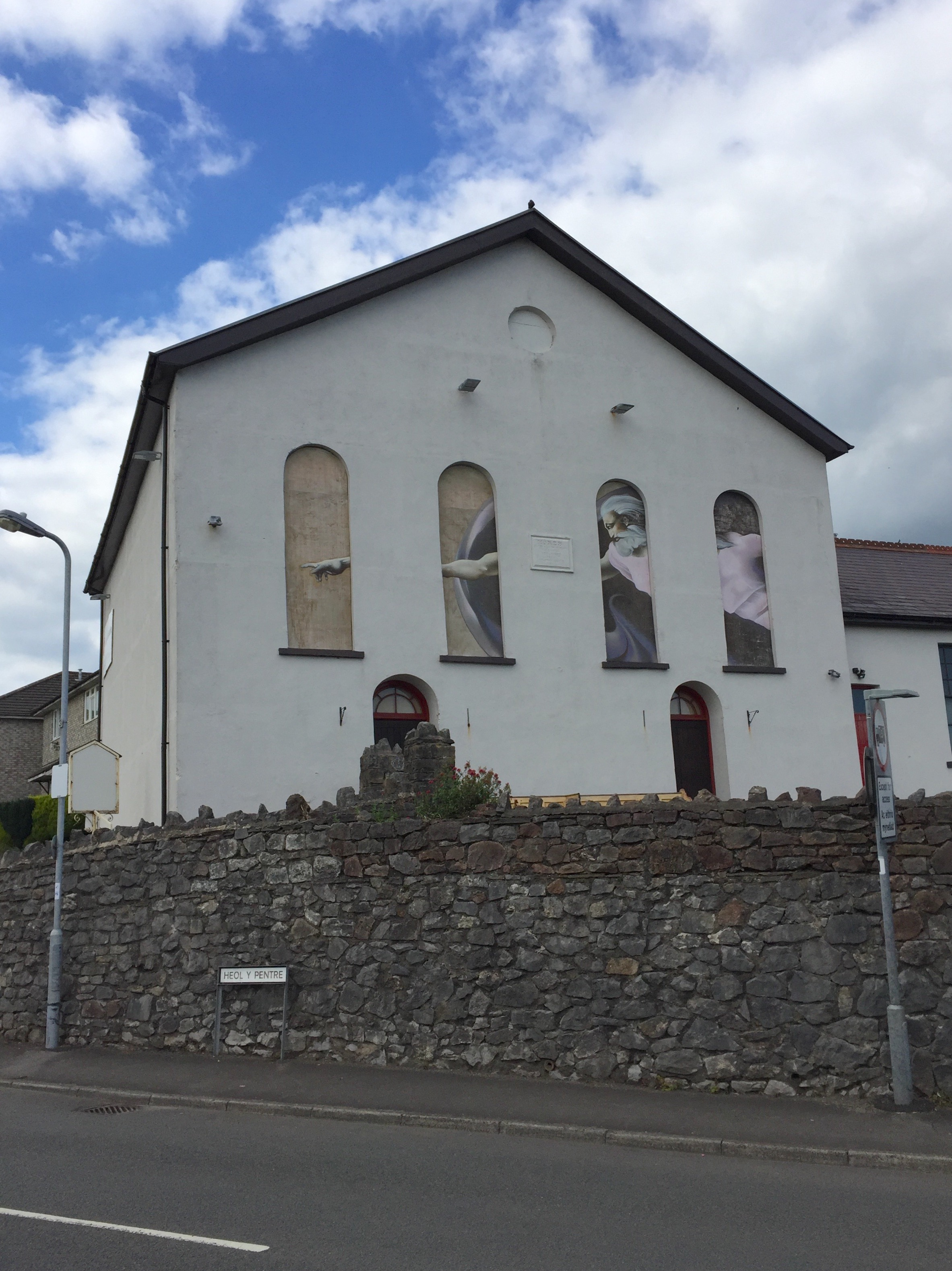
Acapela Studio, Pentyrch

Until 2017 Finch and her then husband Hywel Wigley jointly ran Acapela Studio, a recording facility and venue in a converted chapel in Pentyrch, near Cardiff.

In 2018 Finch released her second album with Senegalese kora player Seckou Keita, entitled SOAR. Reviewing it for the London Evening Standard, Simon Broughton described the work: "A sublime duo of two artists who are masters of their instruments... musicality and architecture at work." Robin Denselow in The Guardian said: "an intriguing collaboration that really works... the interaction is remarkable…an elegant, gently exquisite set".

Finch performed with classically trained Irish folk violinist Aoife Ní Bhriain at the March 2021 Other Voices online festival, playing a duet of Johann Sebastian Bach's Partita No 3. This led to a collaboration between them that produced the 2023 album Double You, a mixture of adaptations of classical pieces and folk tunes from Ireland, Brittany and Wales, along with their own compositions.

== Personal life ==
In 2003, Finch married the music and television producer Hywel Wigley, son of the former Plaid Cymru leader Lord Dafydd Wigley and the harpist Elinor Bennett. They have two children together. The couple divorced in 2017. On 14 December 2019, Finch married her partner Natalie in Tenby.. They formally separated in 2024.

In February 2018 Finch announced that she had been diagnosed with grade 3 breast cancer. She underwent chemotherapy and a double mastectomy at Velindre Cancer Centre, Cardiff, and continued to perform throughout her treatment, completing a 17-date tour with Seckou Keita in April and May 2018.

== Discography ==
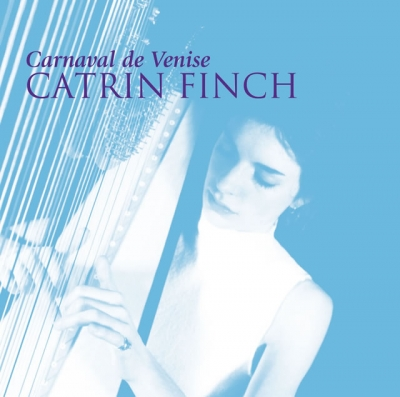
Cover artwork for Carnaval de Venise (2001)

- Bach, J.S.: Goldberg Variations, BWV 988 (2009)
- Crossing the Stone (2003)
- Carnaval de Venise (2001)
- The Harpist
- Catrin Finch Live
- Unexpected Songs (2006) (with cellist Julian Lloyd Webber)
- String Theory
- Little Angels
- Catrin Finch, Harp Recital
- From Coast to Coast
- Annwn (2011)
- Drift Away (Not released – in conjunction with "ZingZillas")
- Blessing (2012) (with John Rutter)
- Clychau Dibon (2013) (with Seckou Keita)
- Lullabies (2013)
- Tides (2015)
- SOAR (2018) (with Seckou Keita)
- Echo (2022) (with Seckou Keita)
- Double You (2023) (with Aoife Ní Bhriain)
- Notes to Self (2026)

Court offices
Preceded by (new post)	Official Harpist to the Prince of Wales; 2000–2004	Succeeded by Jemima Phillips
