= Sean O'Dwyer =

- Born: 11 September 1941 (age 84)
- Education: Royal Military Academy Sandhurst
- Occupations: Planter, philanthropist

This page is about the soldier. For the artist, see Sean O'Dwyer (artist).

Lieutenant-Colonel Sean Gillespie O'Dwyer, CVO DL (born 11 September 1941) was Private Secretary and Equerry to the Duke of York 1987-1990 and Private Secretary and Equerry to Prince Edward, Earl of Wessex from 1987 to 2001.

== Biography ==
=== Early life ===
Sean O'Dwyer was born 11 September 1941. He was educated at the Royal Military Academy Sandhurst.

=== Career ===
He served in the Irish Guards from 22 December 1961 to 1 November 1987.

He attended the NATO Defence College, and was a technical staff officer. He was promoted to lieutenant on 22 June 1963, was temporary captain on 1 December 1965, and promoted to captain on 22 December 1967, major on 31 December 1973, and to lieutenant-colonel on 30 June 1981. He was commanding officer of the 1st Battalion of the Irish Guards in 1984. He was later senior lieutenant-colonel, and on the staff of Headquarters London District to 1987.

He received the LVO in 1996 and the CVO in 2001.

He serves as Vice President of the Guards Polo Club.
