= Children & the Arts =

Independent UK charity

Children & the Arts is an independent charity that provides access to professional arts venues for young people in the UK who would otherwise grow up having had no, or very limited opportunity, to engage with the arts. The charity works across the United Kingdom and across a variety of art forms, working in schools and children's hospices, allowing local arts venues and children to build sustained and engaged relationships. Children & the Arts is the only children's charity working with hard to reach children to tackle inequality of access across all art forms and across the whole of the UK.

Arts venues and cultural organisations are selected to be part of Children & the Arts' national Start programme that enables them to partner with schools in local areas of deprivation - schools that have very limited arts provision for students and no connection to their cultural community. Children & the Arts provides the three-year framework, guidance and funding for arts organisations to each work with 300-500 school children every year. Children are introduced to an artform, inspired to find out more, taught how to enhance their experience of the arts through critique and teamwork and, of course, create and perform themselves.

The charity was formerly known as The Prince's Foundation for Children & the Arts and was one of the Princes Charities, and prior to that The Prince of Wales Arts & Kids Foundation. It was created by another of the Prince's charities; Arts & Business (formerly the Association for Business Sponsorship of the Arts or ABSA), under the aegis of its chief executive, Colin Tweedy and launched at an event at Buckingham Palace.

== Origin ==
Children & the Arts began when King Charles III (then Prince of Wales) visited a pupil referral unit in Balsall Heath, Birmingham.

While going round the school he saw a class studying Shakespeare's "Romeo and Juliet" under the direction of an inspiring teacher who had roused a great response to the play from the pupils. His Royal Highness was surprised to hear that the children were studying the play without seeing it performed.

Coincidentally, the Royal Shakespeare Company was performing "Romeo and Juliet" at Stratford at the time. Being president of the Royal Shakespeare Company, Charles suggested that the class might like to go and see it. The class went and, after the performance, the cast entertained them on stage.

After the trip all of the students wrote to the Prince saying it was the best experience of their lives. As a result of this experience he decided to take action and began the process which led to the development of his Foundation for Children & the Arts.
