= Yeoman archer =

English or Welsh military longbow archers (mounted or foot) of the 14th-15th centuries

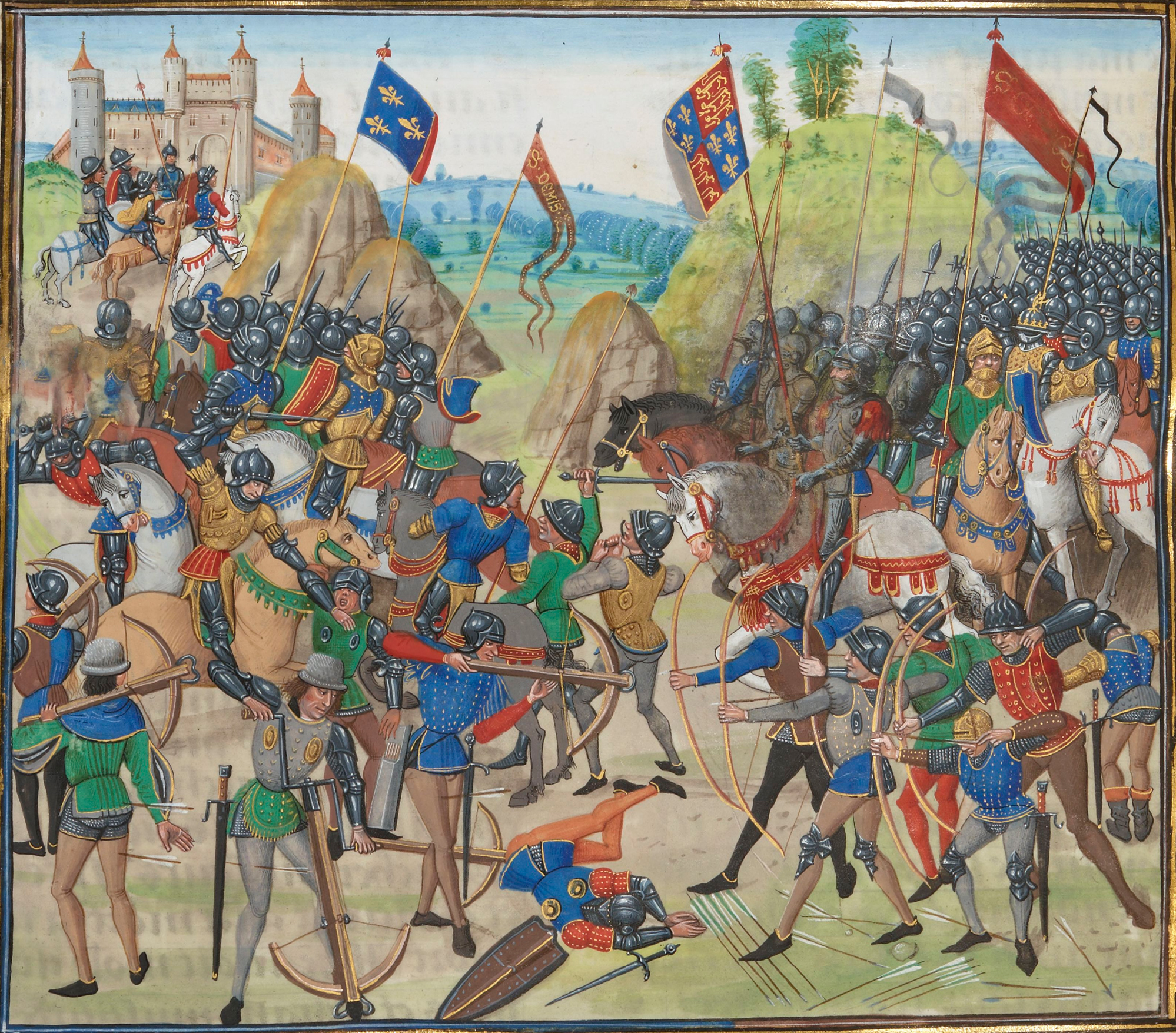
Battle of Crécy, as depicted in a 15th-century illuminated manuscript of Jean Froissart's Chronicles. Both armies are shown stylistically; archers in the foreground. English archers are shown with the legendary longbow, while the Italian mercenaries struggle with their crossbows.

The Yeoman Archer is a term applied specifically to English and Welsh military longbow archers (either mounted or on foot) of the 14th-15th centuries. Yeoman archers were commoners; free-born members of the social classes below the nobility and gentry. They were a product of the English form of feudalism in which the military duty of a knight to his lord (which was implicit in tenure feudalism) was replaced by paid, short-term service. By negating the tactical advantage of large numbers of cavalry (mounted knights and men-at-arms) with their ability to rapidly fire volleys of arrows, Yeoman Archers are considered part of the Infantry Revolution of the 14th century. The Battles of Crécy and Agincourt are the best known victories of the Yeoman Archers.

== History ==
The Yeoman Archers were the English Army's response to a chronic manpower problem when trying to field an army on Continental Europe during the 14th century. Against 27,000 French knights, England could only muster at most 5,000 men-at-arms. With this 5:1 tactical disadvantage, the English needed a strategic advantage.

=== Edward I ===
When Edward I invaded Wales in 1282, he quickly realized the battlefield importance of the opposing Welsh archers. Firing from ambush, they inflicted serious casualties on Edward's army. When Edward invaded Scotland for the second time in 1298, his army consisted mostly of infantry (12,500 of 15,000 men). 2,000 men, including archers, were raised as part of the Lancashire and Cheshire levies under the Commission of Array. At the Battle of Falkirk, the English army archers opened up the Scottish schiltrons with hails of arrows. The Scottish infantrymen fled the battlefield, to be pursued and killed by the English cavalry. Between 1300 and 1304, Edward returned to Scotland four more times to complete his conquest. However, the size of his army grew smaller with each campaign, as the Scots refused to meet Edward in battle. Edward appeared to realize that large numbers of infantry troops were not mobile enough to chase and do battle with an elusive opponent. In the meantime, however, the men of North Wales and the English counties along the Scottish border were acquiring military experience. The yeoman archers were learning new skills as mounted archers.

=== Edward II ===
Edward died in 1307, while en route to Scotland for yet another invasion. His son, now King Edward II, continued his father's Scottish campaigns beginning in 1313. Then came the disastrous defeat at Battle of Bannockburn in 1314. The army was in marching order, with the archers at the rear of the column. They could do nothing against the Scottish spearmen attacking the front of the column. Edward II was later deposed in 1327 by a coup engineered by his wife, Queen Isabella and her paramour, Roger Mortimer. Three years later, his son King Edward III, wrested control of England from his mother and executed Mortimer.

=== Edward III ===
In 1333, Edward III undertook his first invasion of Scotland, which culminated with the Battle of Halidon Hill. Halidon Hill is where the 20-year old Edward III learned how to combine archers and dismounted men-at-arms - tactics that he would employ during his Crecy Campaign in France.

==== Crecy Campaign ====
The 1344 Household Ordinance of King Edward III provides some contemporary evidence for the use of archers in Edward's Crecy Campaign in France. Only The King's Archers (a total of 121 men) are identified with a functional title. The rest of the archers are listed as either Archers, Archers on foot, or Archers on horse. The latter title does not imply archers shooting from horseback. It refers to the English practice of having mounted archers being able to reach the scene quickly, dismount, and set up a firing line. The Archers on foot would then follow as reinforcements. The Esquires of the King's Household (a total of 101) were responsible for 60 Archers on horse, and 21 Archers on foot. The Household Officers and Ministers had 21 Archers on horse for their protection. Even the 19 Minstrels had 3 Archers on horse and 3 Archers on foot assigned as protection. At the end of the listing, a total of 20,076 Archers was given for Edward's entire army. The daily wage for the three classes of archers is interesting when compared to the Yeomen of the King's Chamber, who received 6 pence a day. The King's Archers received 6 pence; Archers on horse received 4 pence; and Archers on foot received 3 pence. In contrast, the 4,244 Welshmen on foot received just 2 pence. From the description Welshmen on foot and only receiving a daily wage of 2 pence, it is uncertain that these Welshmen were archers.

Crécy was followed by another English victory at the Battle of Poitiers, and a final victory at the Siege of Calais. By the end of the Hundred Years War, the Yeoman Archer had become as legendary as his bow.

==== Recruitment ====
Edward I had used the Commission of Array to conscript his infantry and archers. Unfortunately, this method tended to scoop up men from the very bottom rungs of feudal social ladder, and very few archers. His grandson, Edward III, introduced a new recruiting technique called contracted indentures. They were agreements for military service for a specified period at a specified price. The indenture was agreed between the King and an individual commander. Usually, these were the same men who would have owed the King feudal military service. Under the indenture, the commander would recruit his own archers and men-at-arms (usually squires) as a single cohesive force. Thus, those going into battle were among men they knew and had trained with. Furthermore, since the archers had to provide their own horses, they would be of at least moderate means. Economics of war drew the social levels of the men-at-arms and the yeoman closer together. Yeomen archers were becoming the lower level of the gentry.

There were four reasons why a man-at-arms or a yeoman would go to war in France: pay; plunder; patronage; and pardon. The daily wage was rather attractive; as described above. But English kings were notoriously slow with their pay, especially in time of war. Plunder was a much greater attraction. The division of battle spoils was actually written into the indentures. Normally, the king was entitled to one-third of all the spoils taken by his contracted commanders. In turn, the commanders were entitled to one-third of the spoils taken by their men. Patronage was almost as attractive as booty. Combat camaraderie counts for a lot once the war is over. Just as the king would look more favorably upon a commander who served him well in the campaign, so would that commander look more favorably upon a yeoman who served him faithfully. Finally, there is a pardon. Many excellent archers were outlaws, and the king offered pardons for all their offenses, including murder.
