= Official Harpist to the Prince of Wales =

The Official Harpist to the Prince of Wales, or King's Harpist, is a position within the Royal Household of the United Kingdom.

== History ==
The harp is an important national instrument in Wales. The role of Official Harpist had fallen out of use since it was last granted to John Thomas in 1871 by Queen Victoria. But in 2000, the then Prince of Wales restored the role in order to foster and encourage young musical talent in Wales and the UK and to raise the profile of the harp as an instrument.

On 5 July 2006, the Prince of Wales was presented with a £150,000 gold leaf harp from harp maker Victor Salvi of the Italian harp makers Salvi Harps. The harp is used by the official harpist.

Following Prince Charles's accession to the throne in 2022, the role has been referred to as King's Harpist, and is currently held by Mared Pugh Evans.

== List of official harpists ==
- John Thomas, 1871
- Catrin Finch, 2000 to 2004
- Jemima Phillips, 2004 to 2007
- Claire Jones, 2007 to 2011
- Hannah Stone, 2011 to 2015
- Anne Denholm, 2015 to 2019
- Alis Huws, 2019 to 2024
- Mared Emyr Pugh-Evans, 2024 onwards
