= Miele (disambiguation) =

Miele is a manufacturer of domestic appliances and commercial equipment.

Miele may also refer to:

== People ==
- André Miele (born 1987), Brazilian tennis player
- Carl Miele (1869–1938), German entrepreneur
- Frank Miele (born 1948), American journalist
- Rudolf Miele (1929–2004), German entrepreneur
- Vittorio Miele (1926–1999), Italian painter

== Other uses ==
- Miele (bicycle), a Canadian bicycle manufacturer
- Miele (film), a 2013 Italian film
- Miele (river), Germany
- Miele Guide, a regional guide book to restaurants in Asia
- Miele, a Winx Club character
