= Michael Caruso (editor) =

American Journalist, editor, and media executive

- Born: Copenhagen, Denmark
- Education: Columbia University (BA)
- Occupations: Journalist; Editor-in-chief; Media executive
- Known for: Smithsonian Editor-in-chief (2011-2019) coining the term "elevator pitch"
- Spouse: Andrea Sheehan
- Children: 4
- Parent: Jerome Caruso (father)

Michael Caruso is an American journalist, editor-in-chief, and media executive. He served as editor-in-chief and Vice President of Smithsonian where he added authors including Jane Goodall, Doris Kearns Goodwin, Jane Smiley, Isabel Wilkerson, and Billy Collins. Caruso is credited with coining the term "elevator pitch" and was featured in Editor & Publisher magazine's "2023 Class of Creative Visionaries."

== Early life and education ==
Caruso was born in Copenhagen, Denmark and grew up in Lake Forest, Illinois. He received a Bachelor of Arts Degree from Columbia University in 1983. His father, Jerome Caruso, is an industrial designer who has designed International Design Excellence Award-winning pieces for Sub-Zero, Herman Miller, Rockwell International, Motorola and was called "The Man Behind The Kitchen Revolution" by Businessweek.

== Career ==
Caruso joined the journalism industry by working for The New Yorker as a messenger, before becoming executive editor of The Village Voice. He was recruited by Tina Brown to Vanity Fair where he served as senior articles editor. During his tenure, he worked with Norman Mailer, Joyce Carol Oates, and Christopher Hitchens, and coined the term "elevator pitch". He served as editor-in-chief of Los Angeles magazine, Details magazine, Men's Journal, the founding editor of the now-defunct Maximum Golf, editor-at-large at Portfolio magazine, and was the deputy director at the WSJ magazine.

As Editor-in-chief of Details magazine he hired illustrator Art Spiegelman as a comics editor and sent comics artists out to report stories visually. Caruso also created a Hollywood issue that commissioned Adam Rifkin to write an original screenplay treatment “The Accidental Killer.” The screenplay was then photographed by Albert Watson, featuring Billy Zane and Rose McGowan, and was published as movie stills in 32 pages in the March, 1998 Hollywood issue.

Caruso founded Maximum Golf magazine in 2000. The launch party took place in New York’s Central Park with guests including Donald Trump with-then girlfriend Melania Knauss (now Melania Trump.) Knauss was photographed for the inaugural issue in a bathtub filled with golf balls. The event featured a 100-foot putt for a $1 million prize. A self-described "weekend golfer" won the prize.

In 2011, Caruso was hired as editor-in-chief at Smithsonian magazine, becoming the fourth editor in the magazine's then 41-year history. He began organizing issues around themes and commissioned pieces by Ruth Reichl, Mimi Sheraton, David Maraniss, Natalie Angier and Sloane Crosley. Caruso's reorganization was described as "smart and playful" by Adweek. During his tenure, Smithsonian magazine earned multiple National Magazine Award nominations for General Excellence, Special Interest, and Feature Writing.

Caruso also served as Vice President of Live Events at Smithsonian, where he created The American Ingenuity Awards program. The annual event was held at the National Portrait Gallery and a private reception was hosted by Chief Justice John Roberts. Winners included John Legend, Lin-Manuel Miranda, Elon Musk, Jeff Bezos, John Leguizamo, and Janelle Monáe. Presenters included Stephen Hawking, Stevie Wonder, Oprah Winfrey, Stephen Colbert, Quincy Jones, and Malala. Caruso also created the event, Future Con, an annual three-day festival blending science and science fiction. Participants included Buzz Aldrin, Patrick Stewart, and William Shatner, as well as scientists from NASA. Future Con later became part of Awesome Con, a comic-con held annually at the Washington Convention Center.

In 2019, Caruso became the Editorial Director at The Hill, where he created a new platform called Changing America, producing features stories and documentary-style videos on climate change, energy, education, health care and technology.

Caruso was the CEO and Publisher of The New Republic during 2023-2024. After his departure, owner Win McCormack stated, “During his time at TNR, he turned our financial fortunes around, exceeded all of his goals, and put us on track to sustained success.”
