= Fulgor Milano =

- Company type: privately held
- Industry: Appliance manufacturing
- Founded: 1949; 77 years ago in Gallarate, Italy
- Headquarters: Gallarate, Italy
- Area served: Worldwide
- Key people: Gianni Meneghetti (CEO)
- Products: Cooking ranges; Cooktops; Ovens
- Parent: Meneghetti S.p.A.
- Website: fulgor-milano.com

FULGOR Milano (pronounced "Full-goar Miˈla‧no") is a registered trademark of Meneghetti S.p.a., an Italian manufacturer of premium major appliances and ceramic glass grills. Fulgor's global headquarters are located in Rosa, Italy, near Bassano Del Grappa in Italy's Veneto Region. The company's products compete with those made by companies Sub-Zero, Bosch, Thermador, Dacor, Miele, Viking Range, or Smeg.

== History ==
Fulgor was founded by Piero Puricelli in 1949 shortly after he began working on a coal-powered cooker he hoped to develop. Piero chose the name Fulgor for his budding company because of its Latin meaning; "to shine". The company began mass-producing their first line of coal-powered cookers, or ranges as they are known in North America, in 1955. Beginning later, in 1974, Fulgor began production of built-in gas cooktops and electric wall ovens. In the early 1990s, the company became one of the first manufacturers to introduce "gas on glass" cooktops and self-cleaning wall ovens. By 1994 Fulgor's products had caught the eye of many key global appliance brands, and the company began exporting its product to North America and other parts of Europe.

== Original Equipment Manufacturing & Private Label ==
Before pushing for greater exposure of their own branded line of appliances in the early 2000s, Fulgor was historically known as a key global finished goods supplier to several of the major appliance brands in Europe and North America. In Europe, Fulgor has supplied finished product to the following manufacturing & retail brands: Whirlpool Europe, Auchan, BUT, Carrefour, Conforama, Corte Ingles, Electric Depot and Ocean, among others. In North America, Fulgor was the first European brand to export cooking appliances to North American manufacturing brands. To date, the company has worked with brands like KitchenAid, GE Monogram, Bosch, Viking Range and Fagor. Fulgor used to be marketed in North America under the FCI label.

== Fulgor Global ==
As of 2009, Fulgor operated eight sales offices globally, according to their company website. The company sells its products across Europe, North America and Australia, in at least 15 separate nations. The company's North American division was first opened in 2005, and later reorganized under the name Fulgor USA, LLC in 2008 with the slogan "arte culinaria", Italian for "culinary art". In North America, Fulgor Milano is sold through exclusive premium appliance distributors. The current [when?] product line in North America consists of professional ranges, built in ovens, gas and electric cooktops, microwaves, dishwashers and refrigeration.

== See also ==
- List of Italian companies
