= Jörg Friedrich =

Jörg Friedrich may refer to:

- Jörg Friedrich (author), German author
- Jörg Friedrich (rower), German rower
- Jörg Friedrich (architect), German architect
