= Jörg Friedrich (architect) =

German architect

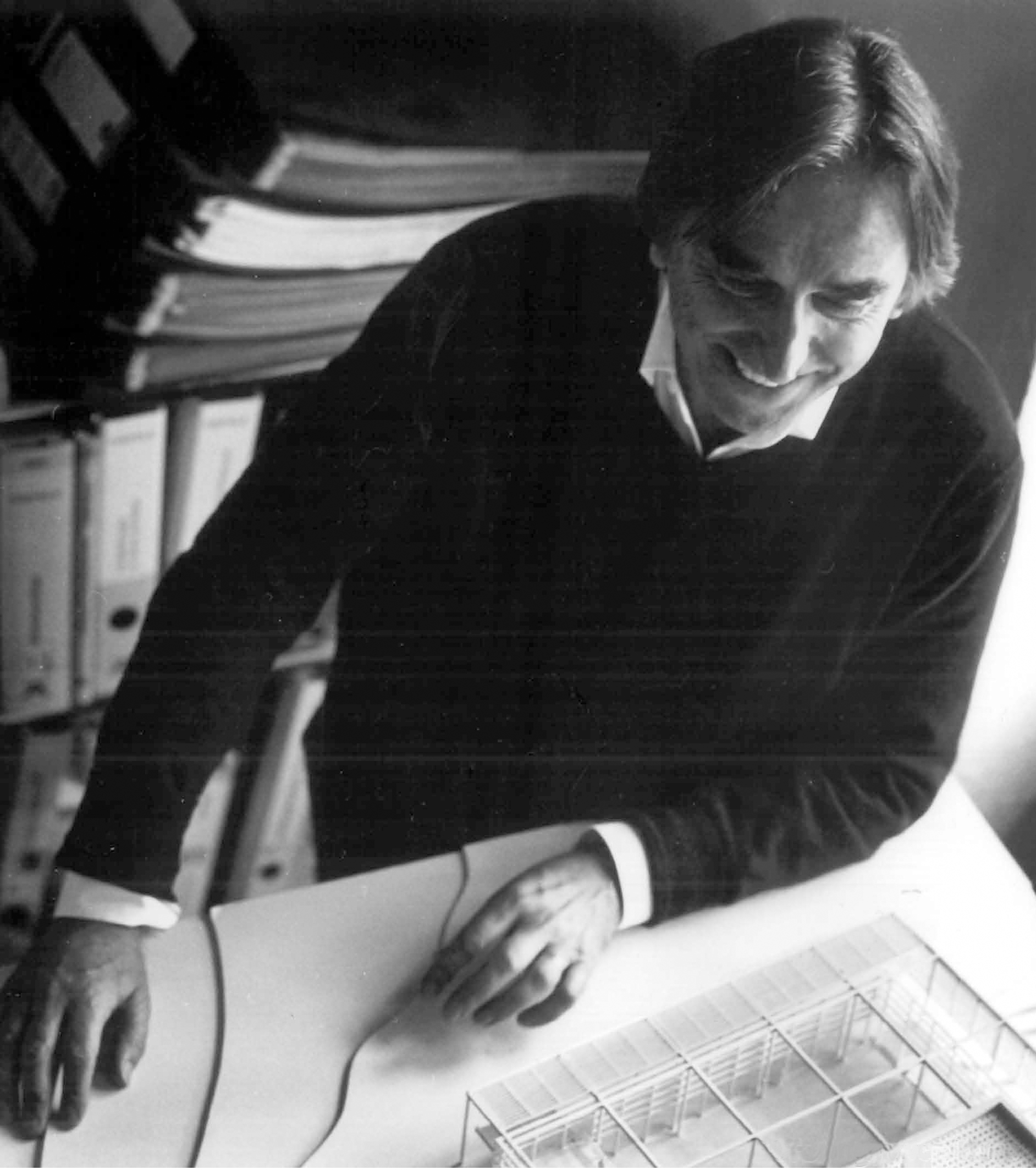
Jörg Friedrich

Jörg Friedrich (born 1951 in Erfurt) is a German architect.

== Career ==
He received his degree as an architect in 1978 at the University of Stuttgart. Following collaboration with the architects, Peter Poelzig and Joachim Schürmann in their offices in Berlin and Cologne, he became independent in 1980 with an office in Venice, together with Bernd Sammek, Jürgen Böge and Ingeborg Lindner. Following his work together with Luitpold Frommel at the Max Planck Institute in Rome 1984/85, Jörg Friedrich established the international office of architecture, pfp-architects, with its headquarters in Hamburg, later also with offices in Genoa and Rome. Jörg Friedrich assumed the position of lecturer at the History of Arts Institutes at the Universities of Hamburg (1983-1986), of Genoa, of Rome and of Wuppertal. In the year 2005 he became a member of the Evaluation Commission at the Academy of Architecture in Mendrisio. From 1988 until 2000 as Professor in Hamburg Jörg Friedrich taught courses in Drafting and the History of Architecture. He received an offer of a professorship in 1992 at the RWTH in Aachen and chaired the departments of Structural Concepts and the Theory of Architecture in 2000 at the Leibniz University in Hanover. Jörg Friedrich was Chairman of the Department of Architecture at the Free Academy of Arts in Hamburg from 1994 to 1998 where he is yet a member and where he was appointed to the “Committee of the Fritz Schumacher Award” in Hamburg in 2006. He is a member of the “Dramaturgical Society” as well as of the “Foundation Architectural Art” in Berlin. In 2013 he was elected Dean of the Leibniz University.

== Selected projects ==
- 2013: Cultural Power Station, central Dresden
- 2012: Congress Center, Padua
- 2012: Main-Franconia Theater, Würzburg
- 2011: Theater, Large Auditorium and Foyer, Düsseldorf
- 2010: New Theater Building, Gütersloh
- 2010: Construction of New Medical Clinics in Darmstadt’s Hospital Center, including Memorial Site for Former Liberal Synagogue, Darmstadt
- 2010: Staatstheater - Schauspielhaus redevelopment, Nuremberg
- 2008: Competency Center of the Chamber of Handcraftsmanship, Harburg – Hamburg
- 2008: Residential Construction “Bavaria Grounds”, St. Pauli, Hamburg
- 2006: Residential Building at Kaiser Quay in Harbour City, Hamburg
- 2003: Sports Center and Residential Area in the Lotharinger Strasse, Münster
- 2003: Theater Erfurt
- 2002: Canteen and Auditorium Maximum, Central University Area, Flensburg
- 1998: Officers’ Army Training Academy, Sports Center, Renovation Measures, Dresden
- 1997: Nursing Center, Kindergarten and Senior Residence Facilities in „St. Loyen”, Lemgo
- 1993: Main Administration Building of the City Works, Witten, Westphalia

== Awards ==
- 2010 BDA Hamburg Prize for Architecture / 1. Prize for the Elbe Campus, Chamber of Handcraftsmanship Hamburg
- 2008 BDA Hamburg Prize for Architecture / 3. Prize for residential construction on the Bavaria grounds
- 2008 BDA Hamburg Prize for Architecture 2008 in acknowledgement of residential construction in the “Harbor City” at the Kaiser Quay
- 2008 1. Prize for the Center of Competency, Chamber of Handcraftsmanship Hamburg (Elbe Campus), Yearbook “Architecture in Hamburg”, distinguished projects 1989-2008
- 2007 Architectural and Engineering Association, Hamburg: Building of the Year 2007, award for residential construction at the Bavaria site
- 2007 Foundation award 2007 in recognition of the “Living City” project for the Park Terrace in Göhren, Thuringia
- 2004 Thüringen State Prize for Architecture and Urban Design in recognition of the Opera / Theater in Erfurt
- 2000 Architecture – Art Award, New Saxony Art Association, Dresden
- 1997 “Fine Building Distinction” for the administration building in Witten
- 1989 Architecture Prize Recklinghausen for Justice Training Academy, North Rhine-Westphalia
- 1987 Federal Republic of Germany Award
- 1986 The City of Hamburg’s Promotion Prize “Fritz Schumacher Award”
- 1984 North Rhine Westphalian Promotion Prize for Young Artists

== Exhibitions ==
- 2007 German Architecture Museum, Frankfurt: New Building Sites, Building in the New Federal States
- 2003 Hamburg, Museum of the History of Hamburg, “The Dream of the City on the Sea” (curator)
- 2003 Architectural Summer in Hamburg
- 2004 Hanover, A Radical City Vision, Kestner Society
- 2005 German Architecture Museum, ”Giuseppe Terragni – Models of a Rational Architecture” (curator)
- 2002 Contribution made to the Venice Biennale of Architecture
- 2001 Erfurt, Vision of a Theater
- 1998 Aachen: A New Gallery for the Ludwig Collection, Jörg Friedrich: Drafts and Drawings
- 1997 Rotterdam: Gallery of the Netherlands’ Architectural Institute
- 1994 Hamburg, Architecture Gallery Renate Kammer, Jörg Friedrich: Drafts and Projects
- 1987 Rome: Architecture Gallery SALA UNO, Jörg Friedrich: 5 Projects

== Selected publications ==
- Architecture in Hamburg, Yearbook, Junius Publishing Company, Hamburg (1989, 92-95, 97, 99, 2002–04, 06, 08, 11-12)
- AIT, Architecture, Interior Design, Technical Refinement, Alexander Koch, Berlin 1999, 2012
- Jörg Friedrich – “Theaters”, Ivana Paonessa, Jovis Publishing House, Berlin 2011
- The New Theater Nuremberg, Henschel Publishing Company, Leipzig 2010
- An Adornment of our City, Martin Frenzel, Justus von Liebig Publishers, Darmstadt 2008
- Town Houses, Sybille Kramer, Braun Publishing House, Switzerland 2008
- Plans, Projects, Buildings, Jörn Walter, Braun Publishing House, Switzerland 2005
- FLARE, Architectural Lighting Magazine, n°38, Editrice Habitat, Milan 2005
- The Erfurt Theater, A Space for Visions, Guy Montavon, Erfurt Theater, 2004
- The World of Construction 1996, 2004
- ARC – HH, Architecture Made in Hamburg, Dirk Meyhöfer, Junius Publishing Company, Hamburg 2003
- Radical City Vision, Urban Planning Models for Hanover, Niggli Publishing Company 2002
- Giuseppe Terragni, Models of a Rational Architecture, Niggli Publishing Company, 1999
- Luigi Snozzi, Urban Development, Niggli Publishing Company, 1997
- L’architettura della democrazia (Architecture in a Democracy); ABITARE, Abitrare Segesta Publishers, Milan 1995
- Witten’s main Administration Building, Department of Works, Jörg Friedrich, Ingeborg Flagge, Ernst and Son, Berlin 1994
- CUBE, The Hamburg Magazine for Architecture, Modern Living and Style, b1 Communication GmbH, Düsseldorf
