= Holger Bertrand Flöttmann =

German neurologist and psychiatrist (born 1946)

Holger Bertrand Flöttmann is a German neurologist, psychiatrist and a doctor for psychosomatic medicine. Flöttmann is known for his scientific research in dream symbols, in borderline personality disorder, in the psychotherapeutic process and anxiety. He is also renowned for his expansion of the concept of symbiosis and his psychoanalytical works about fascism, terrorism and other actual themes about civilisation. Dr. Flöttmann worked in the centre of dream research and anxiety disorders.

== Biography ==
=== Early life ===
Flöttmann was born in 1946 as the third of seven children by the married couple Wilhelm Flöttmann and Ingeborg Flöttmann, born Tinzmann. He visited the Evangelisch Stiftische Gymnasium in Gütersloh. In the age of 14 years, he studied during the Easter holidays Freud's Dream analysis. Other books about psychoanalysis from S. Freud and L. Klages followed. After the high school diploma Flöttmann fulfilled the alternative civilian service from 1966 until 1968 in the von Bodelschwinghschen Anstalten Bethel in Bielefeld in the house Arimathia. During this time he finished the training in a health care assistant. Flöttmann married in the year 1982, out of this marriage came three children.

=== Medical training ===
From 1968 until 1974 Flöttmann studied medicine in Kiel, Germany, from 1976 until 1977 he worked in the Universitäts–Frauenklinik, Kiel, in the Hospital of Oldenburg/Holstein and in the Städtische Krankenhaus Ravensburg as a medicinal assistant.

In the clinic Alpenblick Neutrauchburg he qualified in psychoanalysis and depth psychology from 1976 until 1977. At the same time he trained in Munich at the "Institut for Group and Family Therapy", transactional analysis und Gestalt therapy. In the years 1977 from 1983 proceeded the qualification for the consultant of neurology and psychiatry on the university hospital for psychiatry and neurology in Kiel.

He acquired the title psychotherapy in 1982, the title psychotherapeutic and psychosomatic medicine in the year 1998. Flöttmann is authorized by the medical association for the advanced training in the title psychotherapy.

== Scientific work ==
The dream research takes centre stage of Flöttmann's scientific practice. On this field, he is reputed to be an accounted expert. Since 1986 he has deposed 42,000 dreams in a specific database: Dr. Flöttmann's Scientific Encyclopedia of Dream Symbols. This Encyclopedia includes 1,833 dream symbols. It was steadily updated.

If the symbol "hedge" exists 136 times within 42,000 dreams e.g., these 136 dreams are extracted by the computer. Then the scientist analyzes each dream. The great experience of the researcher with dream analysis and the language of the unconsciousness helps to understand the sense of these dreams as well as the personal knowledge of the explored dreamers. The broad fundament of this scientific work builds Dr. Flöttmann's qualification in medicine, in psychoanalysis, in depth psychology, psychiatry, neurology, psychosomatic medicine, Gestalt therapy, graphology, philosophy, phrenology and physiognomy.

Dr. Flöttmann has given many lectures both at home and abroad.

== Publications ==
- Steuerrecht des Lebens Novum-Verlag, Horitschon 2006, ISBN 978-3-902514-53-0
- Angst-Ursprung und Überwindung. Seventh Edition, Kohlhammer, Stuttgart 2015, ISBN 978-3-17-026145-7
- Träume zeigen neue Wege. Sixth Edition, BOD Norderstedt, 2013, ISBN 978-3-8423-7197-2
- Dr. Flöttmann's Scientific Encyclopedia of Dream Symbols. Second Edition, BOD Norderstedt, 2013, ISBN 978-3-8482-2135-6
