= Elevator pitch =

Short description of an idea, product or company

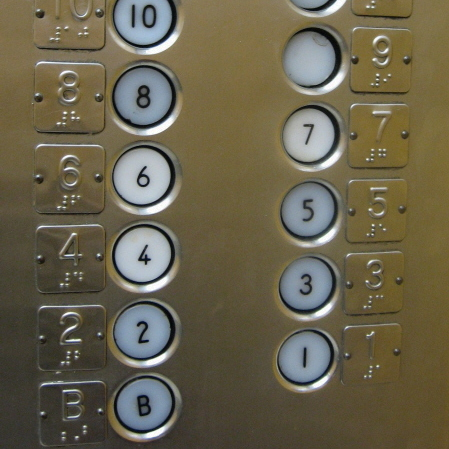
An elevator pitch quickly summarises an idea, product or service during a short journey in an elevator

An elevator pitch, elevator speech, lift speech, or elevator statement is a short description of an idea, product, or company that explains the concept in a way such that any listener can understand it in a short period of time. This description typically explains who the thing is for, what it does, why it is needed, and how it will get done. When explaining an individual person, the description generally explains one's skills and goals, and why they would be a productive and beneficial person to have on a team or within a company or project. An elevator pitch does not have to include all of these components, but it usually does at least explain what the idea, product, company, or person is and their value.

Business growth strategist Wendy Shore has noted that the goal of an elevator pitch is not to make a sale but to generate enough interest to earn a continuation of the conversation, positioning it as an opening to a relationship rather than a closing of a transaction.

Unlike a sales pitch, an elevator pitch can be used in a variety of ways, and may not have a clear buyer-seller relationship. The goal is simply to convey the overall concept or topic being pitched in a concise and exciting way.

The name—elevator pitch—reflects the idea that it should be possible to deliver the summary in the time span of an elevator ride, or approximately thirty seconds to two minutes.

== Background information and history ==
There are many origin stories for the elevator pitch. One commonly-known origin story is that of Ilene Rosenzweig and Michael Caruso, two former journalists active in the 1990s. According to Rosenzweig, Caruso was a senior editor at Vanity Fair and was continuously attempting to pitch story ideas to the editor-in-chief at the time, but could never pin her down long enough to do so simply because she was always on the move. So, in order to pitch her ideas, Caruso would join her during short free periods of time she had, such as on an elevator ride. Thus, the concept of an elevator pitch was created, as says Rosenzweig.

However, there is another known potential origin story that dates back before the story of Rosenzweig and Caruso. Philip Crosby, author of The Art of Getting Your Own Sweet Way (1972) and Quality Is Still Free (1996) suggested individuals should have a pre-prepared speech that can deliver information regarding themselves or a quality that they can provide within a short period of time, namely the amount of time of an elevator ride for if an individual finds themselves on an elevator with a prominent figure. Essentially, an elevator pitch is meant to allow an individual to, with very limited time, pitch themselves or an idea to a person who is high up in a company.

Crosby, who worked as a quality test technician, and then later as the Director of Quality at International Telephone and Telegraph, recounted how an elevator pitch could be used to push for change within the company. He planned a speech regarding the change he wanted to see and waited at the elevator at ITT headquarters. Crosby stepped onto an elevator with the CEO of the company to deliver his speech. Once they reached the floor where the CEO was getting off, Crosby was asked to deliver a full presentation on the topic at a meeting for all of the general managers.

== Aspects ==
An elevator pitch is meant to last the duration of an elevator ride, which can vary in length from approximately thirty seconds to two minutes. Therefore, the main focus of an elevator pitch should be making it short and direct. According to the Idaho Business Review, the first two sentences of any elevator pitch are the most important, and should hook or grab the attention of the listener. Information in an elevator pitch, due to the limited amount of time, should be condensed to express the most important ideas or concepts within the allotted time.

The Idaho Business Review also suggests individuals who use an elevator pitch deliver it using simple language, avoiding statistics or other language that may disrupt the focus of the listener. Bloomberg Businessweek suggests that an important lesson to think about when giving an elevator pitch is to "adjust the pitch to the person who is listening, and refine it as you and your business continue to grow and change."

Business practitioners have proposed structured frameworks for crafting effective elevator pitches. LinkedIn business growth strategist Wendy Shore, writing in Entrepreneur, proposed the SHORE framework, a five-step approach comprising solution (defining the problem you solve and its benefits), help (specifying who you help and how), opportunity (highlighting transformative outcomes for the client), relatability (establishing trust through shared experiences and connection), and engage (closing with a clear and specific call to action).

When delivering an elevator pitch, individuals are encouraged to remain flexible and adaptable, and to be able to deliver the pitch in a genuine and fluent fashion. By doing so, the intended audience of the pitch will likely be able to follow the information, and will not consider it as being scripted.

== Advantages ==
Advantages to conducting an elevator pitch include convenience and simplicity. For instance, elevator pitches can be given on short notice and without much preparation, making the listener more comfortable. Furthermore, elevator pitches allow the individual who is giving the pitch the ability to simplify the content and deliver it in a less complicated manner by providing the information in a cut-down fashion that gets right to the point.

== Literal examples ==
Game series Kingdom Hearts was created when Square Enix producer Shinji Hashimoto met a Disney executive in an elevator, and pitched the idea of a game series combining their respective franchises.

== See also ==
- Business plan
- High concept
- Lightning talk
- Log line
- Mission statement
- SWOT analysis
- Vision statement
