= Mainfranken Theater Würzburg =

Coordinates: 49°47′42″N 9°56′12″E

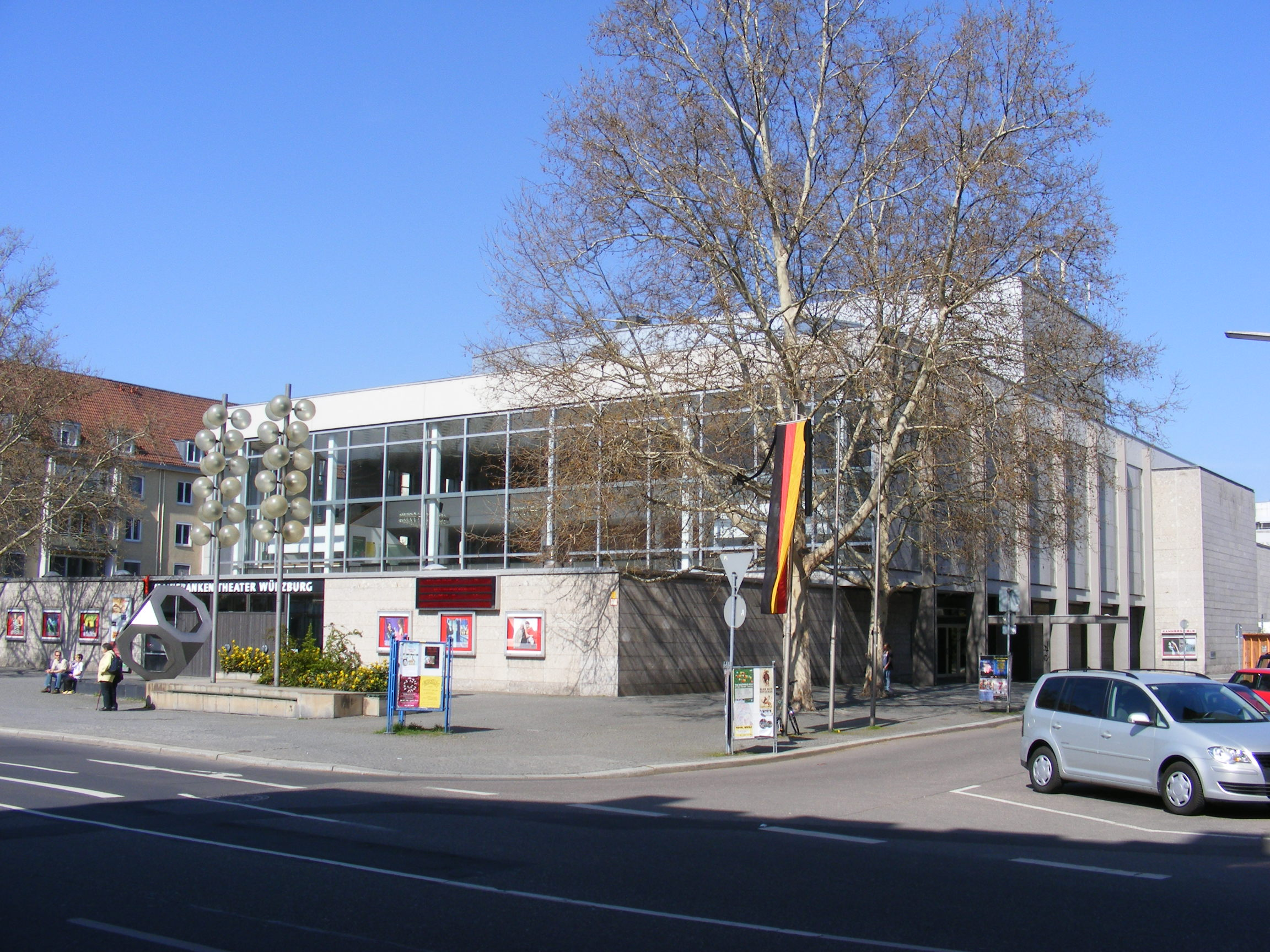
Mainfranken Theater Würzburg

Mainfranken Theater Würzburg is a theatre in Würzburg, Germany. The new building was designed by the architect Jörg Friedrich.
