= Theater Gütersloh =

Theatre in Germany

Coordinates: 51°54′22″N 8°22′14″E

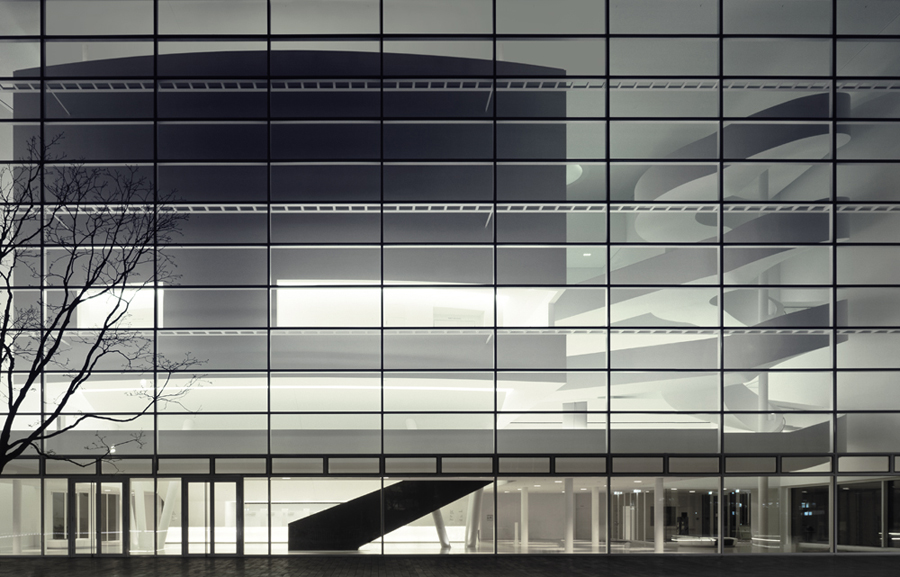
Theater Gütersloh at night, 2011

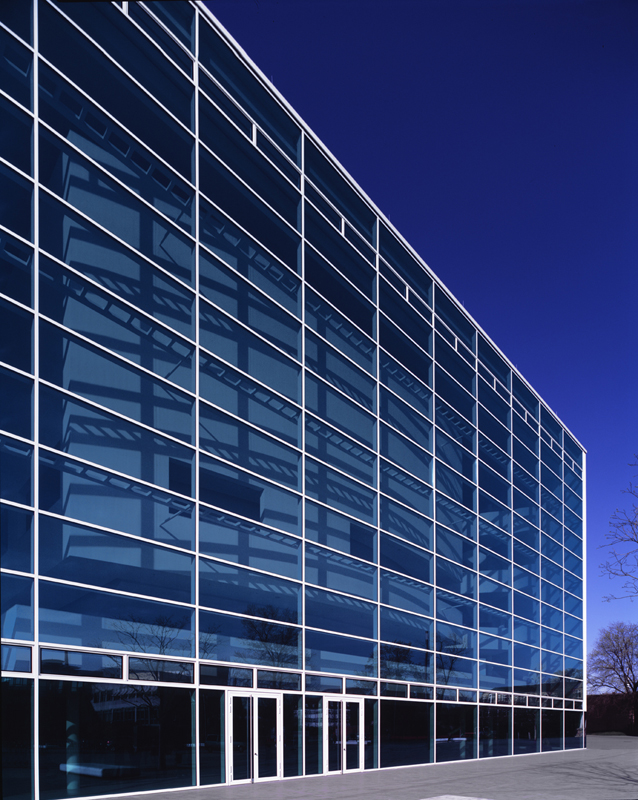
Theater Gütersloh

Theater Gütersloh is a theatre for opera and drama performances in Gütersloh, North Rhine-Westphalia, Germany. The new building was designed by the architect Jörg Friedrich. It was opened in 2010.
