= Mestemacher =

German food company

Mestemacher GmbH
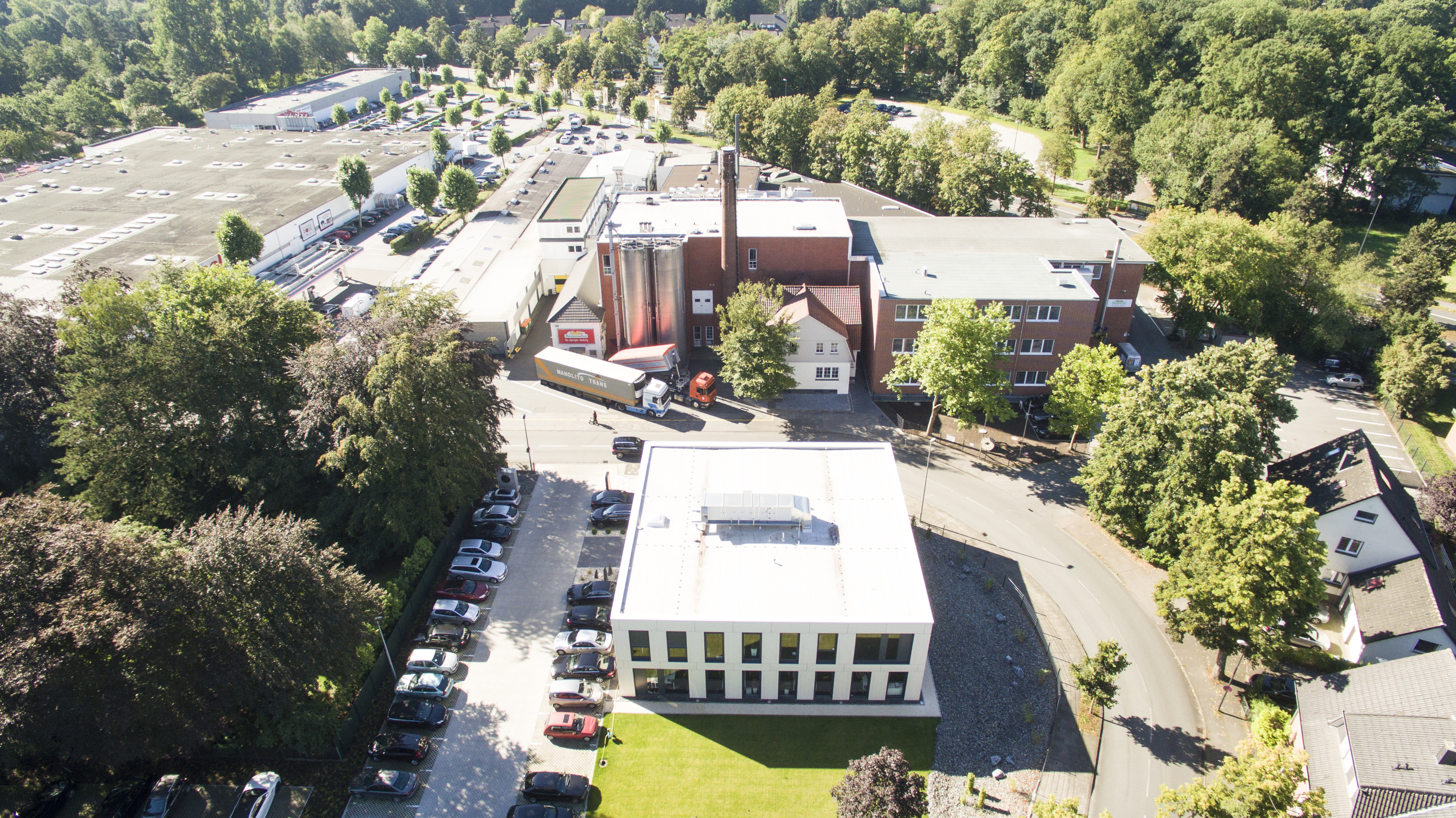
- Administrative building of Mestemacher in Gütersloh
- Type: Public
- Industry: food
- Founded: 1871
- Headquarters: Gütersloh, North Rhine-Westphalia, Germany
- Website: www.mestemacher.de www.mestemacher-gmbh.com mestemacher.shop

Mestemacher GmbH is a German bakery and food manufacturing company headquartered in Gütersloh, North Rhine-Westphalia, Germany. Founded in 1871, the company specializes in packaged wholegrain breads, Westphalian pumpernickel, organic bakery products, protein breads and international bread specialties. Mestemacher is particularly known for its long-life bread products, which are preserved through pasteurization rather than artificial preservatives. The company exports its products to more than 50 countries and is regarded as a leading producer of packaged wholegrain bread and pumpernickel.

== Products ==
Mestemacher produces a range of packaged bakery products, including Westphalian pumpernickel, wholegrain rye breads, organic breads, protein breads and international bread specialities such as wraps.

The company is known for using pasteurisation technology to achieve a long shelf life without the use of chemical preservatives.

== Distribution ==
Mestemacher products are distributed through supermarkets, food retailers and export partners in Germany and internationally. In addition to traditional retail channels, the company operates its own nationwide online shop in Germany. The online shop offers direct-to-consumer sales of the company's bread specialities, including pumpernickel, wholegrain breads, protein breads, organic products and international bread specialities. Orders are shipped directly to consumers throughout Germany.
