= Stadtpark und Botanischer Garten Gütersloh =

Municipal park with botanical garden in North Rhine-Westphalia, Germany

Coordinates: 51.8979°N 8.3910°E

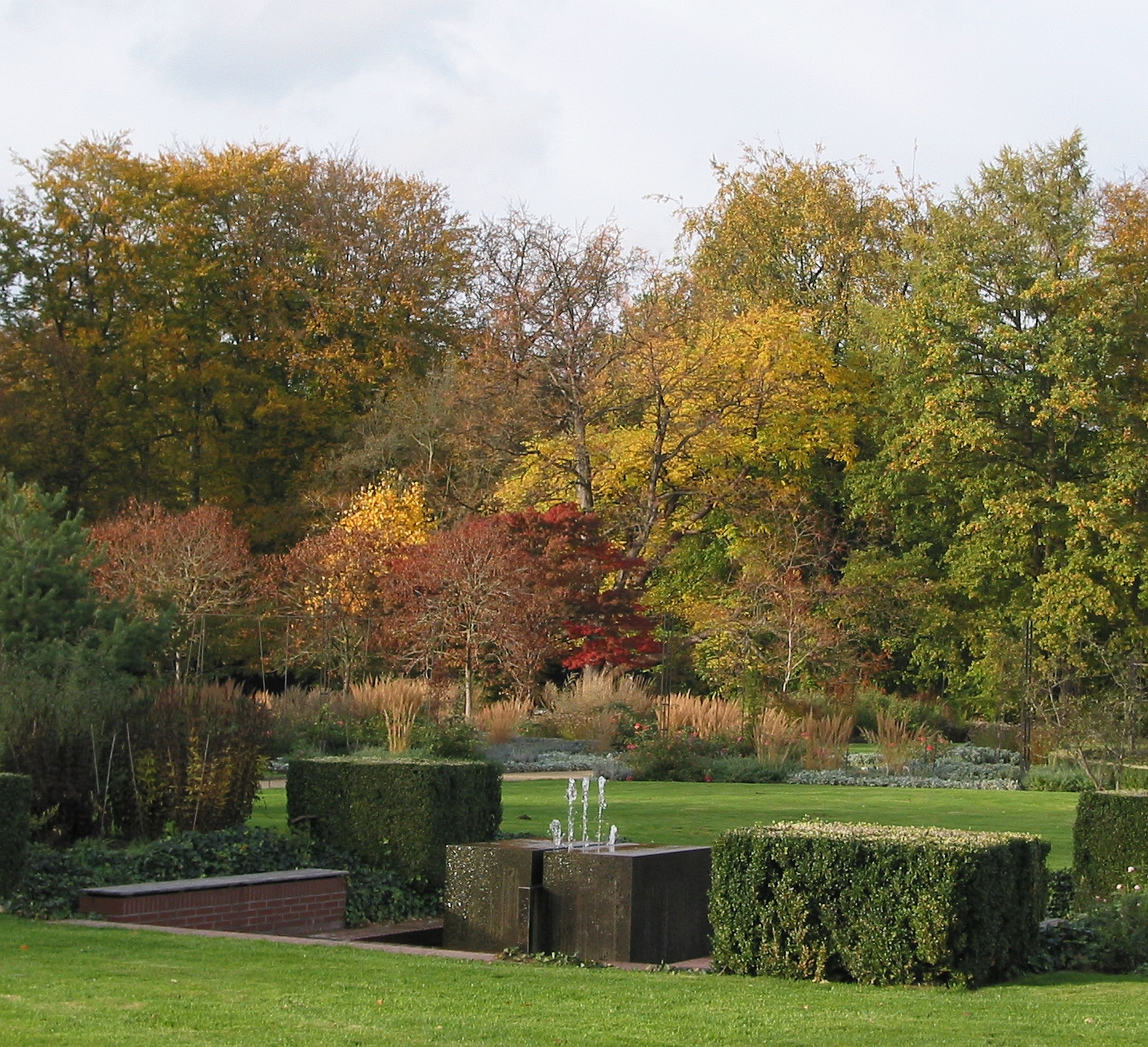
Botanical garden

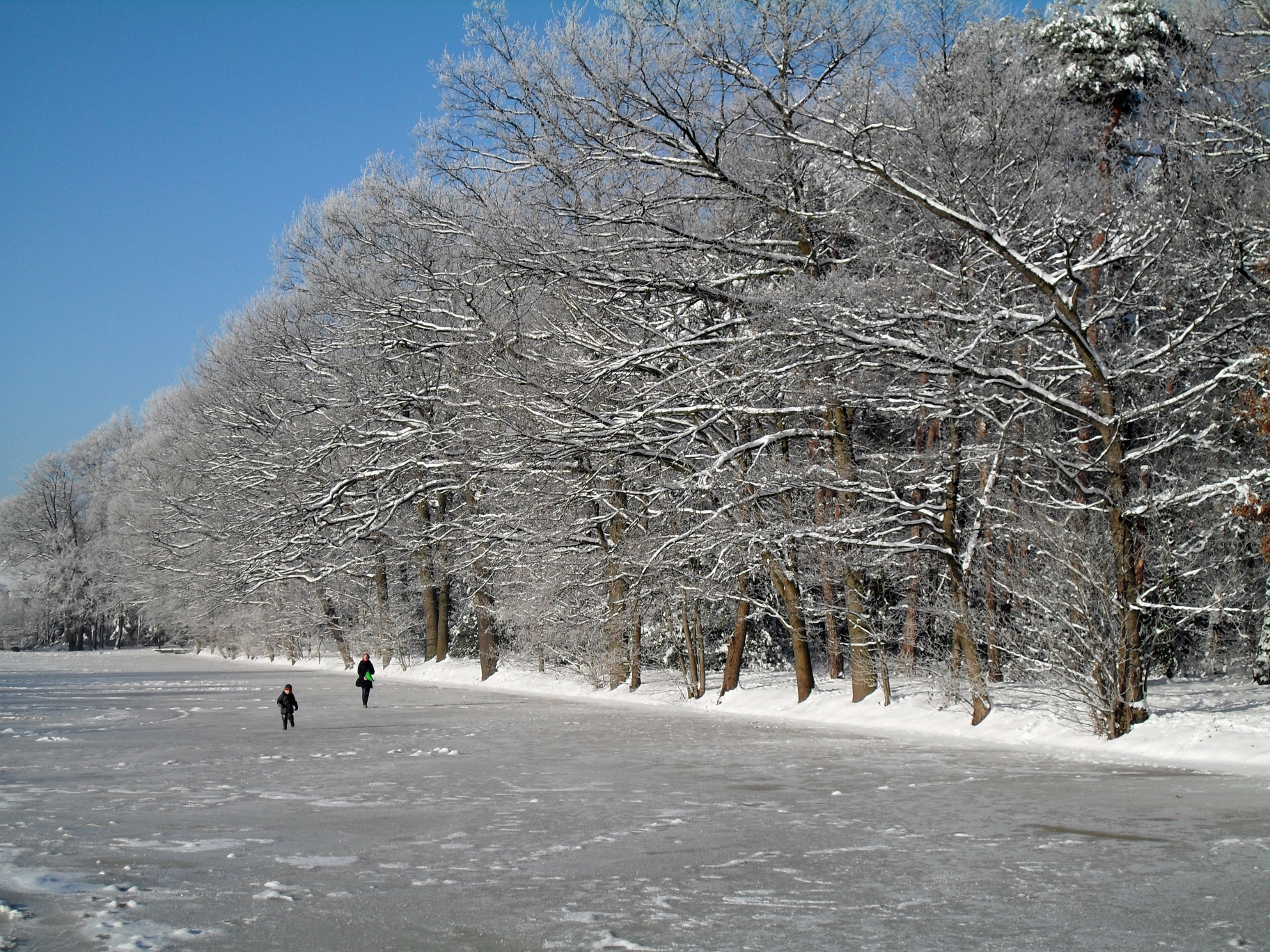
Ice meadow flooded for ice-skating in the winter

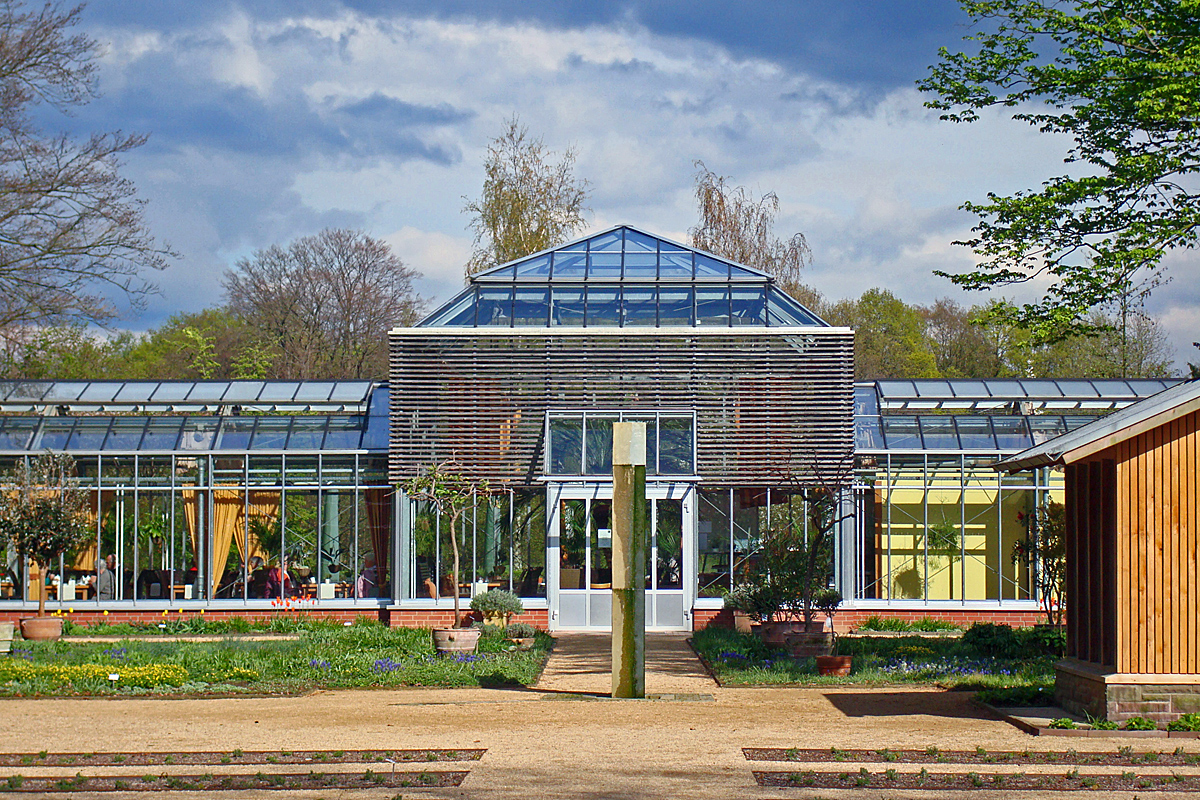
Palmenhauscafé

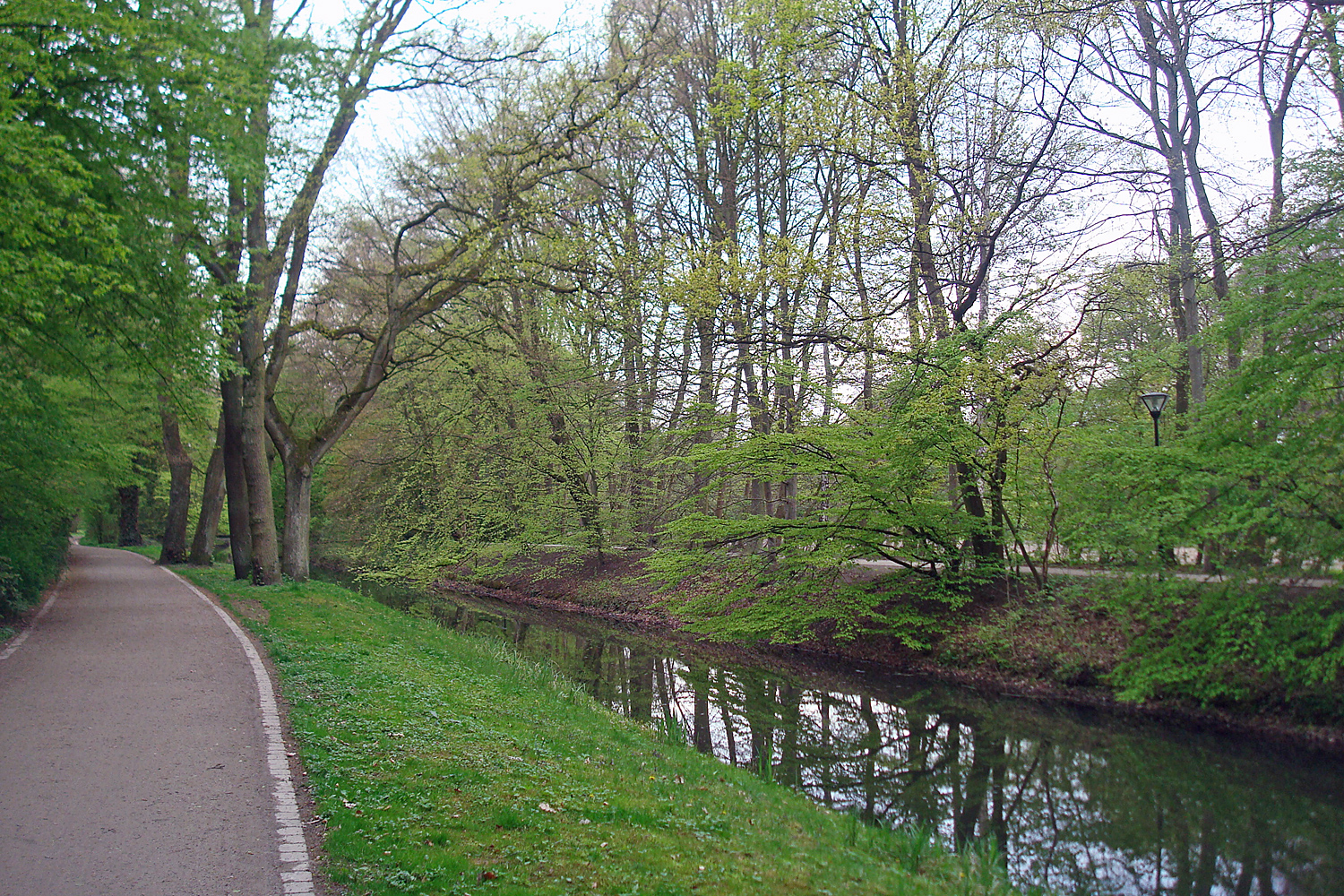
Dalke

The Stadtpark und Botanischer Garten Gütersloh (15.5 hectares) is a municipal park with botanical garden (3 hectares) located at Parkstraße, Gütersloh, North Rhine-Westphalia, Germany. It is a member of the European Garden Heritage Network and open daily without charge.

The park was created between 1906 and 1909 to designs by garden architect Friedrich Wilhelm Schoedder (1855-1938), with the botanical garden added to its northeastern corner in 1912. A palm house was constructed in 1938 but destroyed in World War II; it has subsequently been restored and now houses a café. A rose garden was created in 1941, followed by a birch grove (1950), mini golf course (1960), orchard (1990), herb garden (1998), and sculpture garden (2000).

Today the park retains its original design, broadly patterned upon an English landscape park, with an elongated axis, wide curving paths, lawns, and numerous trees, as well as a meadow flooded for ice-skating in the winter. The botanical garden is laid out as a display garden, with geometric pools, arcades, and high hornbeam hedges. The orchard contains a number of heritage fruit varieties including Westfälischer Gülderling and Schöner aus Wiedenbrück.

== See also ==
- List of botanical gardens in Germany
