= Westaflex =

Large global HVAC brand

Coordinates: 51°52′50″N 8°27′12″E

- Company type: private
- Industry: Consumer Brands & Industrial Technologies
- Founded: 1933
- Headquarters: Gütersloh, Germany
- Key people: Westerbarkey Family (Management Board); Ph.D. Peter Westerbarkey, executive chairman
- Products: Westerflex tubes, silencers, chmineys and automotive parts
- Number of employees: 2700 (worldwide incl. subsidiary companies)
- Website: www.westaflex.com

Westaflex is a large global HVAC brand, owned by German company Westaflex Holding. The company began in 1933 when Lorenz and Ferdinand Westerbarkey, formerly prisoner of war during the Nazi era developed a coil-based tube forming machine, the first stable and any-shape tube of its kind. The company's owner, named it Westaflex, from their family name Westerbarkey (meaning Westerflex HVAC products).

Internationalisation during the 1960s propelled the Westaflex brand to a wider global market. With presence in 32 countries on five continents, Westaflex engages in the majority of their business within Europe and North America.

== Slogans ==
Westaflex's motto is "Verbindungen die sich auszahlen" meaning connections which pay in German. The company also uses the slogan Everything in flexible ducting.

== History ==
Westaflex is a manufacturer of HVAC appliances, commercial equipment, based in Gütersloh, Germany. It was founded as a family business and has always been a privately held, family-owned, family-run company. The respect for co-workers and the environment is part of the German heritage of the company. Wherever Westaflex is located we are engaged in the local social life, either through sponsoring of community activities or actively participating in the daily life of the community (Corporate social responsibility).

Westaflex is a global supplier of automotive and industrial technology and of HVAC consumer goods and building technology. The Westaflex Group comprises some 28 subsidiary companies. One of the cornerstones of the Westaflex Group's product strategy is EDIFACT.

== Arrangement of the company ==
Other companies founded using licences from the Westaflex family business:

- Clevaflex, Cleveland Ohio, is independently owned and operated since 1964 supplying Westaflex and Clevaform style convoluted tubing and ducting for the Automotive and HVAC industries
- Westaflex US is a manufacturer of Westerflex tubes, based in Santa Barbara.
