= Rudolf Miele =

German entrepreneur

Rudolf Miele (4 November 1929 – 19 August 2004) was a German entrepreneur. From 1960 he was acting partner of the household accessory manufacturer Miele. He was born in Gütersloh, Westphalia, the grandson of the Miele founder Carl Miele.

In 1999, Rudolf, like his grandfather before, became an honorary citizen of the German city of Gütersloh, where he died.
