= Jerome Caruso =

American industrial and furniture designer

- Born: 23 October 1937 (age 89); Chicago, Illinois, U.S.
- Education: University of Illinois; University of Copenhagen
- Known for: Industrial design, furniture design
- Notable work: Sub-Zero; Herman Miller; Motorola
- Spouse: Ruth (née Beals) Caruso
- Awards: IDSA Awards; Good Design Award

Jerome Caruso is an American industrial and furniture designer known for his designs for Herman Miller, Sub-Zero, and Motorola. He has won six Industrial Designers Society of America (IDSA) awards and holds more than 100 US and international patents. His Bi-Cast chair is in the American Arts collection at the Art Institute of Chicago.

== Early life and education ==
Jerome Carmel Caruso was born on October 23, 1937 in Chicago, Illinois to parents Carmel Albert and Jessie Dorothea (née Christello) Caruso and was raised in Oak Park, Illinois. At 12 years old, Caruso won a General Motors contest for futuristic car concepts by developing a clay model which he transferred to wood, carving it out by hand. He attended the University of Illinois (member of Phi Kappa Theta) where he received a Bachelor of Fine Arts degree in 1959 and earned a Degree in Fine Arts at the University of Copenhagen in 1961.

== Career ==
While Caruso was in a graduate program at the University of Copenhagen, he began working at Bernadotte & Bjorn, founded by Prince Sigvard Bernadotte of Sweden. At 26 years old, he opened his own design studio in Brussels with clients in Belgium, England, France, and Germany. He later returned to the US and established a studio where his projects ranged from leading Motorola’s entry into the manufacture of LCD watch modules to designing and engineering the first completely machine-produced stack chair.

Caruso designed the Bi-Cast chair (prototyped and managed all tooling) for the first machine-produced stack chair for the U.S. market. His patent for the Bi-Cast chair has 21 separate claims and is featured in the American Arts Collection at the Art Institute of Chicago.

Caruso spearheaded Motorola’s entry into the manufacture of LCD watch modules. For Rockwell International, he designed one of the first LCD desk calculators in the U.S.

He is most well-known for designing Sub-Zero's integrated refrigeration system, which presented a two-drawer base unit with direct and easy access that could be used alone or paired with an upper cabinet and placed anywhere in a kitchen. Another creation was "the invisible kitchen," which was made possible by his patented invention of an "internal hinge," allowing the appearance of perfectly seamless, customizable refrigerator doors and drawers. As a result, refrigerators could be made to "disappear" behind panels that matched the surrounding kitchen cabinets. It was named one of the 10 best products of 1995 by Time Magazine, which wrote, "This is the stuff that Martha Stewart's dreams are made of." BusinessWeek referred to him as "The Man Behind a Kitchen Revolution." Caruso also designed wine storage units for Sub-Zero, including the industry's first built-in units. When Sub-Zero acquired Wolf in 2000, Caruso became the designer for the new cooking appliance division. He designed 25 new cooking appliances which were debuted simultaneously in 2002.

He also designed award-winning ergonomic seating for Herman Miller including the Reaction Chair and Celle Chair. Caruso’s invention of the Composite Spring Control, which he developed with his son Steven Caruso, for the Reaction seating system, was later used in numerous other Herman Miller chairs, including the Sayl chair designed by Yves Béhar and the Aeron chair designed by Bill Stumpf. He also invented an award-winning seating system for Herman Miller called Cellular Suspension, which features an "intelligent surface" of more than 1500 pads and loops on the chair's seat and back. The design was used on the Celle chair he designed for Herman Miller.

== Awards ==
- 1987 - IDSA Award, Sub-Zero 500 Series
- 1991 - IDSA Award, Attiva Seating System/Thonet Industries
- 1995 - Time magazine Year’s 10 Best Products, Sub-Zero 700 Series
- 1997 - IDSA Award, Sub-Zero 500 Series
- 1998 - Annual Design Review, I.D. Magazine, Reaction Chair/Herman Miller
- 1998 - Design Excellence Award, Design Journal, Reaction Chair/Herman Miller
- 1998 - Best of NeoCon Gold Award, Reaction Chair/Herman Miller
- 2001 - IDSA Award, Wine Storage Units/Sub-Zero Freezer Co.
- 2002 - IDSA Award, Reaction Chair/Herman Miller
- 2002 - IDSA Award, Convection Oven Line, Radiant Cooktop Line/Wolf Appliance Company
- 2003 - Good Design Award, Chicago Athenaeum, Convection Oven Line, Radiant Cooktop Line/Wolf Appliance Company
- 2010 - A &D Distinguished Alumni Award, School of Art & Design, University of Illinois

== Personal life ==
Caruso married Ruth Marie Beals in 1960. They moved to Copenhagen, Denmark, where he attended a graduate program in fine arts at the University of Copenhagen. They later moved to Arlington Heights, Illinois and then Lake Forest, Illinois, residing in a house Caruso designed himself. He is also a sculptor and painter, working in a style that blends art, science, and technology. He creates action paintings with liquid colors and then uses high-resolution digital technology to magnify them, creating abstract artworks that can be scaled to wall-sized dimensions. His paintings were made into large-scaled stained glass windows for the chapel of the Northwestern Lake Forest Hospital.

Caruso established the Significant Design Award for graduating seniors at his alma mater, the University of Illinois, a scholarship that honors an outstanding junior or senior in the industrial design program who demonstrates the ability to create significant, sustainable designs that improve the quality of people's lives.
