= Carl Miele =

German entrepreneur

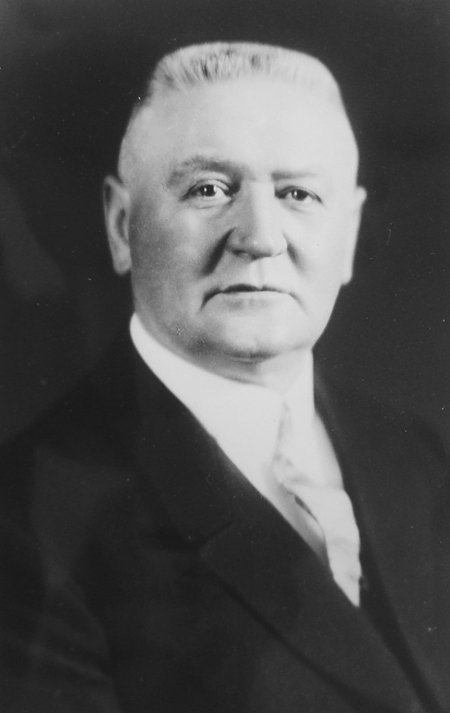
- Miele c. 1935

President of Miele
- In office 1 July 1899 – 24 December 1938 (his death)

Personal details
- Born: Carl Christoph Miele; 25 July 1869 Herzebrock, North German Confederation (now Germany)
- Died: 24 December 1938 (aged 69) Gütersloh, German Reich (now Germany)
- Spouse: Katharina Zuwickern (m. 1896)
- Relations: Rudolf Miele (grandson)
- Children: 5
- Occupation: Businessman, industrialist

Carl Christoph Miele (25 July 1869 – 24 December 1938) also referred to as Carl Miele, Sr. was a German businessman and industrialist who most notably co-founded Miele, a multinational home appliance manufacturer in 1899.

== Early life and education ==
Miele was born 25 July 1869 in Herzebrock, North German Confederation (presently Germany), the only child of Johann Gerhard Miele (1840–1908), a stone mason, and Maria Anna Miele (née Sander; formerly Wittrop; 1827–1907). He had two maternal half-brothers; Friedrich Wittrop (1861–1941) and Franz Wittrop (1866–1942).

After completing compulsory schooling, Miele successfully completed an apprenticeship as stone mason in 1888. Subsequently he studied at the construction trade school in Buxtehude (today hochschule21).

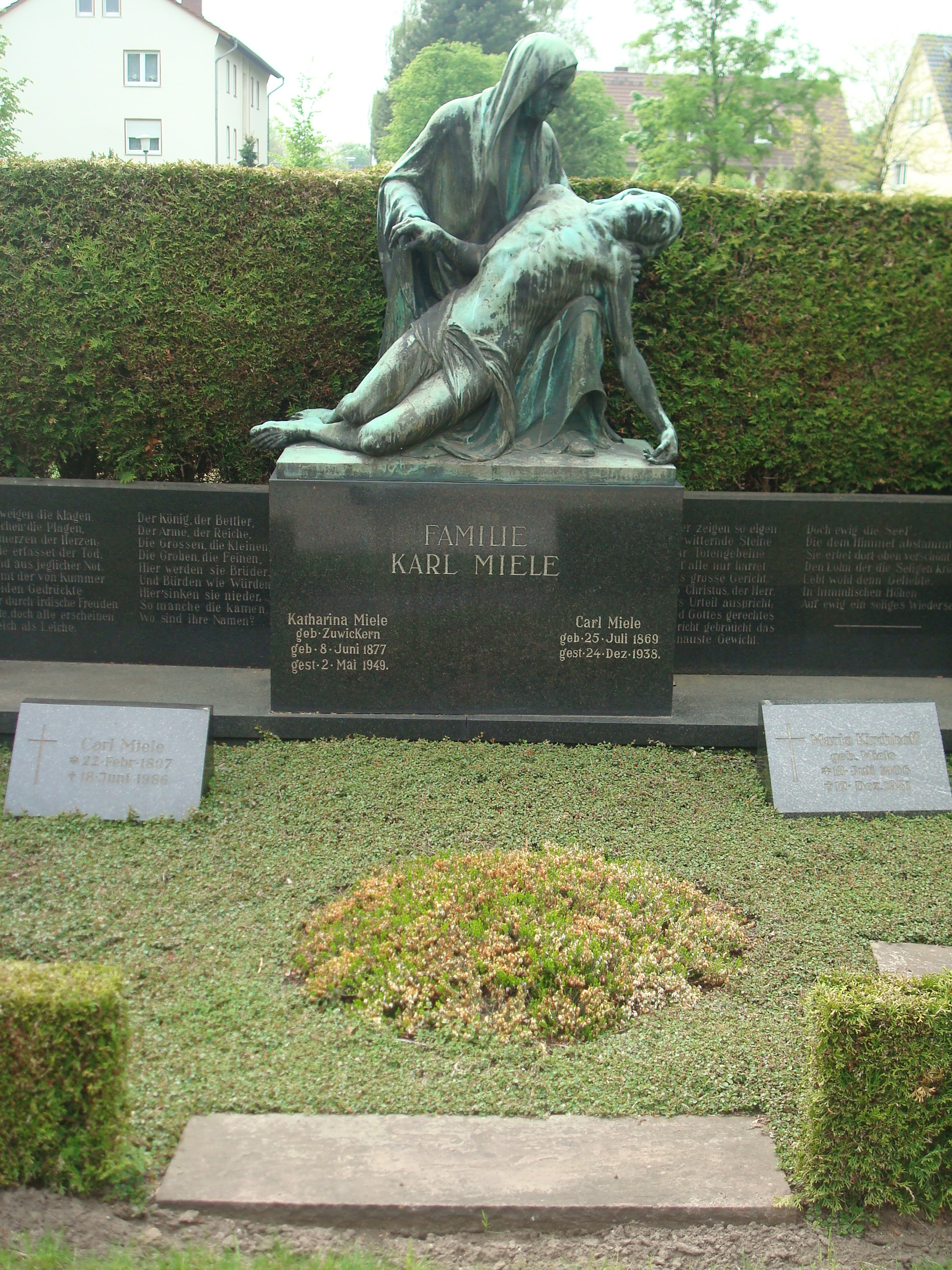
cemetery of family Miele in Gütersloh

== Career ==
Miele completed his military service in the infantry regiment of the Prussian Army in Minden. Subsequently he worked in his fathers business specializing in the construction of commercial chimneys. In 1899, Miele and his partner Reinhard Zinkann, founded Miele. Since then the company has always been a family-owned, family-run company.

== Personal life ==
During his years of initial employment, he met his wife, Katharina Zuwickern, whom he married on 22 April 1896. The couple had three daughters and two sons:

- Carl Miele Jr. (1897–1986), married to Paula Humperdinck, three children including Rudolf Miele
- Anna Miele (1898–1990), married to a Mr. Johenning
- Maria Miele (1906–1951), married to a Mr. Kirchhoff
- Heinrich Miele (1908–1964)
- Margarete Miele, colloquially Grete (1911–1984), married to a Mr. Stratmann

Carl Miele became an honorary citizen of the German city of Gütersloh. He died there on 24 December 1938 aged 69.

== Literature ==
- Barbara Gerstein (1994). "Miele, Carl". Neue Deutsche Biographie (in German). Vol. 17. Berlin: Duncker & Humblot. pp. 474–475. (full text online).
- Marion Steinhart: Carl Miele. Ullstein, Munich 2000, ISBN 3-548-36255-9
