= Rumpel–Leede sign =

The Rumpel–Leede sign is a historical exam for Dengue fever and scurvy. It presents as a distal shower of petechiae that occurs after the release of pressure from a tourniquet or sphygmomanometer.

The blood pressure cuff should be inflated to a pressure between the systolic and diastolic pressures and kept inflated for 5 minutes. A few minutes after releasing the tourniquet if there are more than twenty petechiae per square inch it is a clinical manifestation of scurvy.

== See also ==
- Skin lesion
