= Miele =

German home appliance manufacturer

Coordinates: 51°54′50″N 8°24′07″E

Miele & Cie. KG
- Type: Kommanditgesellschaft
- Industry: Manufacturing
- Founded: 1 July 1899; 127 years ago in Herzebrock, Germany
- Founders: Carl Miele; Reinhard Zinkann
- Headquarters: Gütersloh, Germany
- Key people: Markus Miele (Co-Proprietor, MD); Reinhard Zinkann Jr. (Co-Proprietor, MD); Olaf Bartsch (Finances, Administration); Axel Kniehl (Marketing, Sales); Stefan Breit (Technology)
- Products: Domestic appliances and commercial equipment
- Revenue: ▲€5.4 billion (2022)
- Owners: Miele family (51.1%); Zinkann family (48.9%)
- Number of employees: 23,322 (December 31, 2022)
- Website: www.miele.com

Miele (/ˈmiːlə/ MEE-lə; German: [ˈmiːlə]) is a German manufacturer of high-end domestic appliances and commercial equipment, headquartered in Gütersloh, Ostwestfalen-Lippe. The company was founded in 1899 by Carl Miele and Reinhard Zinkann, and has always been a family-owned and family-run company. The Miele family holds 51.1%, and the Zinkann family owns 48.9% of the company.

== History ==
Miele's first products were a cream separator, butter churn, and tub washing machine, under the Meteor brand. Carl Miele supervised manufacturing personally, and Reinhard Zinkann apprenticed and handled finances and sales.

Miele began producing vacuum cleaners in 1927. Two years later, in 1929, it introduced Europe's first electric dishwasher. In the 1930's, the company also manufactured motorcycles; by 1932, it had become the largest centrifuge manufacturer in Europe.

During World War II, Miele produced torpedoes, mines, and grenades for the German war effort using slave labor. It is estimated that by 1944, 95% of the company's revenue was derived from producing and selling armaments.

The Miele trademark was established with the foundation of Miele & Cie., on 1 July 1899, and appeared on all machines, nameplates, printed materials and advertising produced by the company. From 1949 a recognition feature of the logo has been a sloping dash used as the dot on the "i".

In 1996, Miele established a joint venture with Melitta to open a factory in Dongguan, China. This facility became fully owned by the Miele Group in 2009 and now plays a key role in the production of vacuum cleaners, including models such as the Swing H1, Compact C1, Compact C2, and Complete C2.

Miele exports products to global markets and is represented in 47 countries. Their expansion into the United States came in 1983, when they established corporate headquarters in Somerset, New Jersey. In 1999, they relocated to the new headquarters in Princeton, which was designed by the Driehaus Prize winner Michael Graves. Most products are made in Germany, Switzerland, Austria, the Czech Republic and Romania.

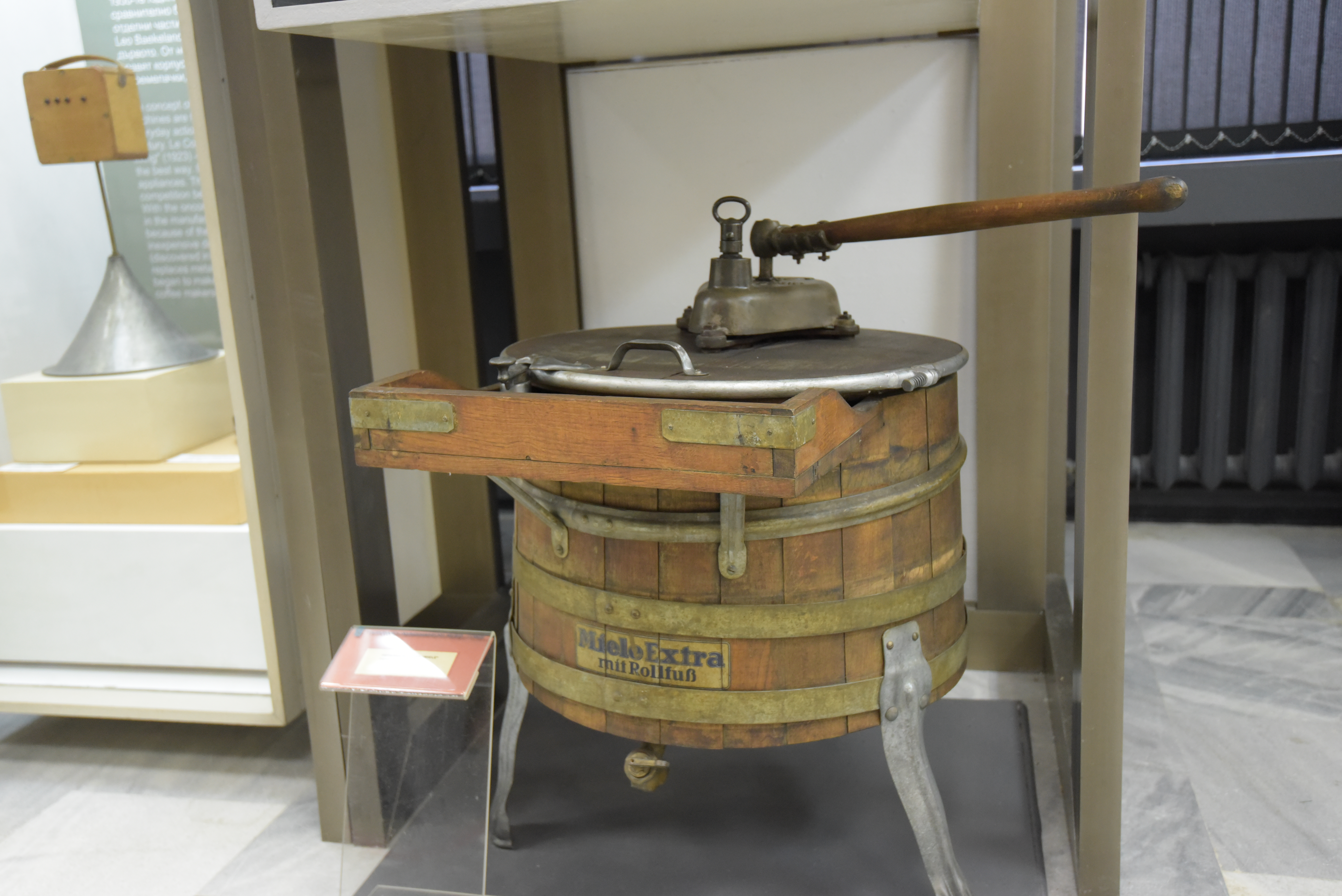
Washing machine MieleExtra from 1915. Exhibited at the National Polytechnic Museum, Sofia

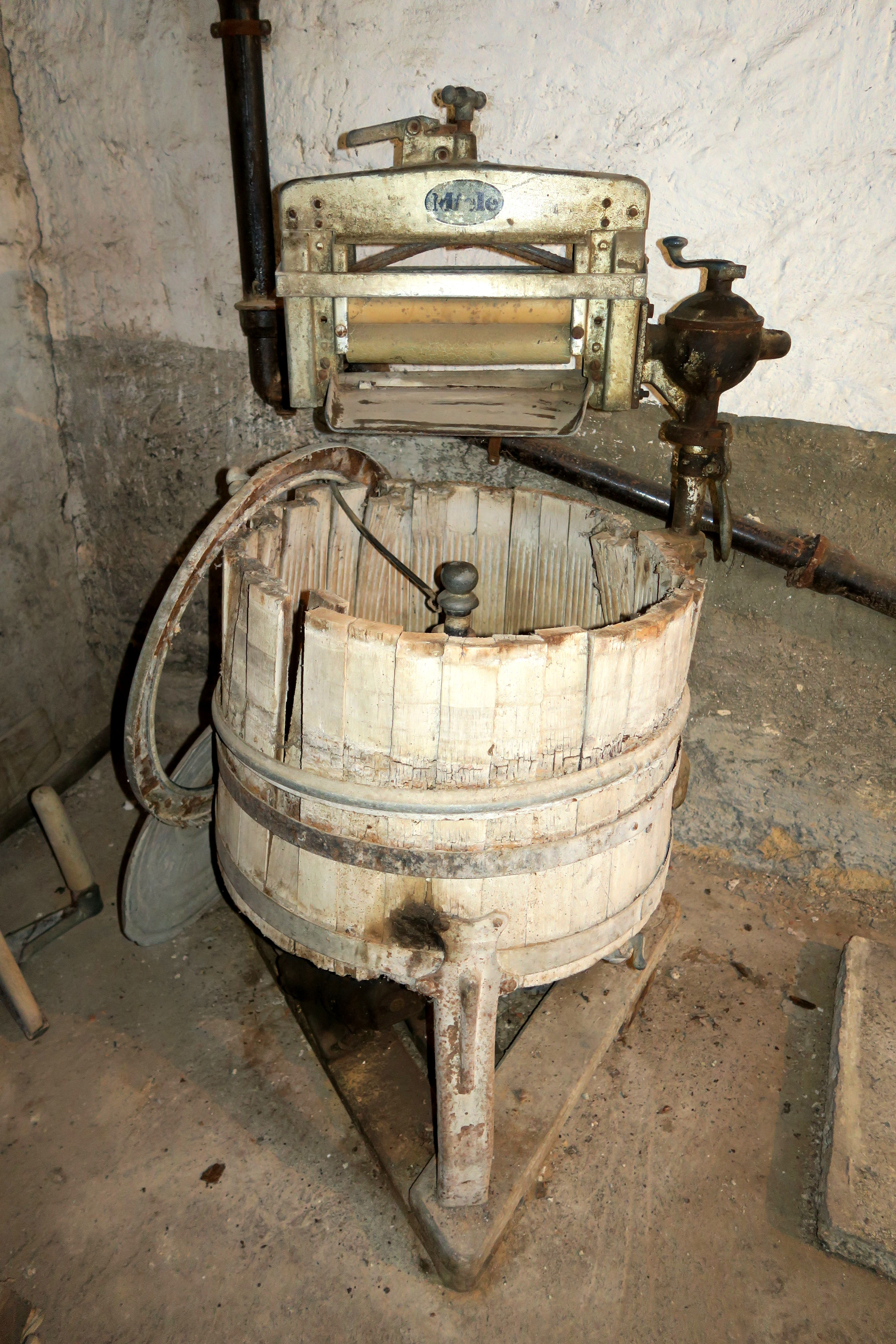
Early Miele washing machine with a mangle (probably 1930)

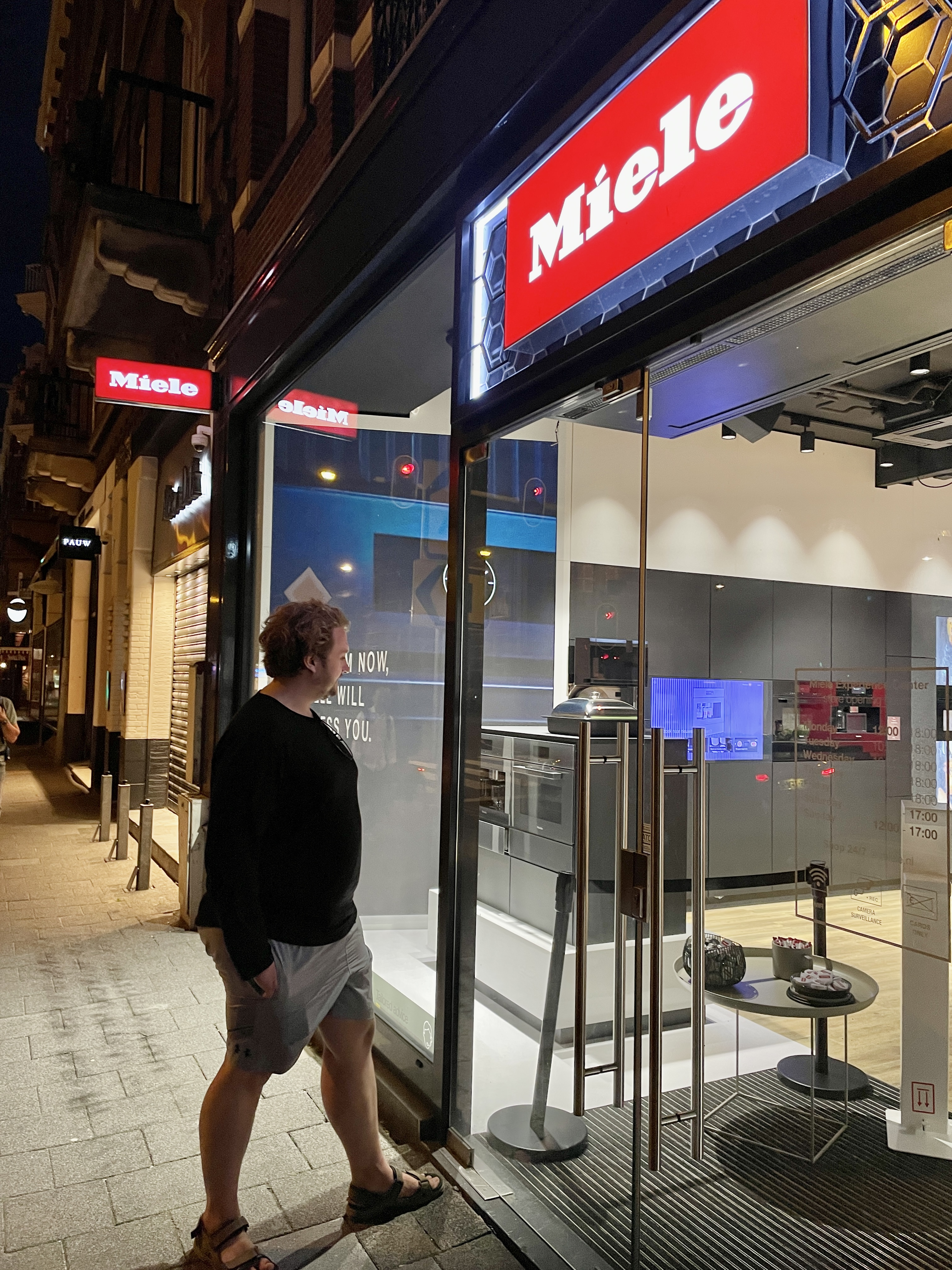
Miele Experience Center in Amsterdam

== Products ==
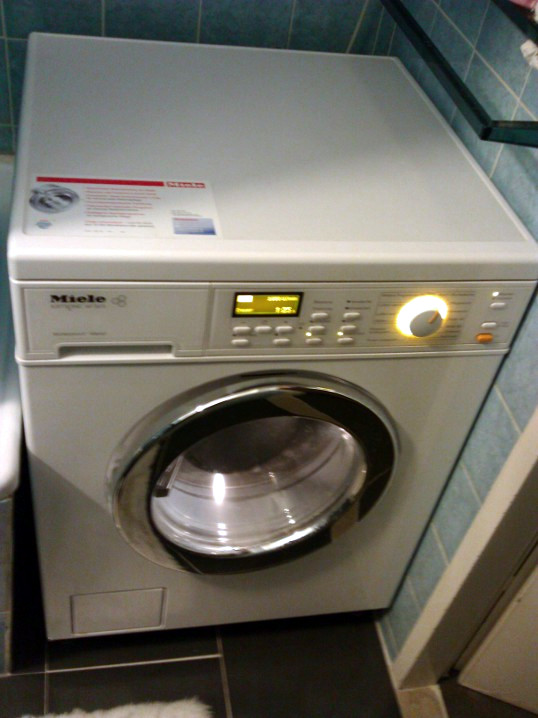
A washer-dryer made by Miele

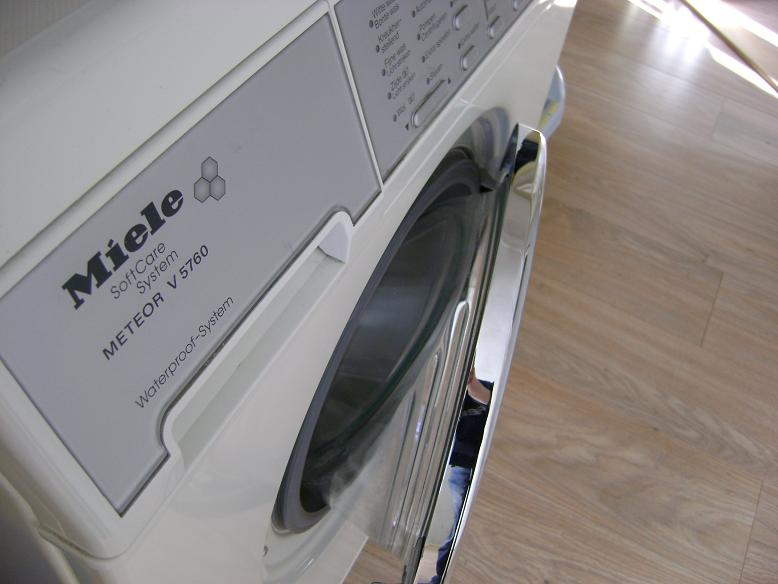
Miele Meteor V5760 front-load washing machine

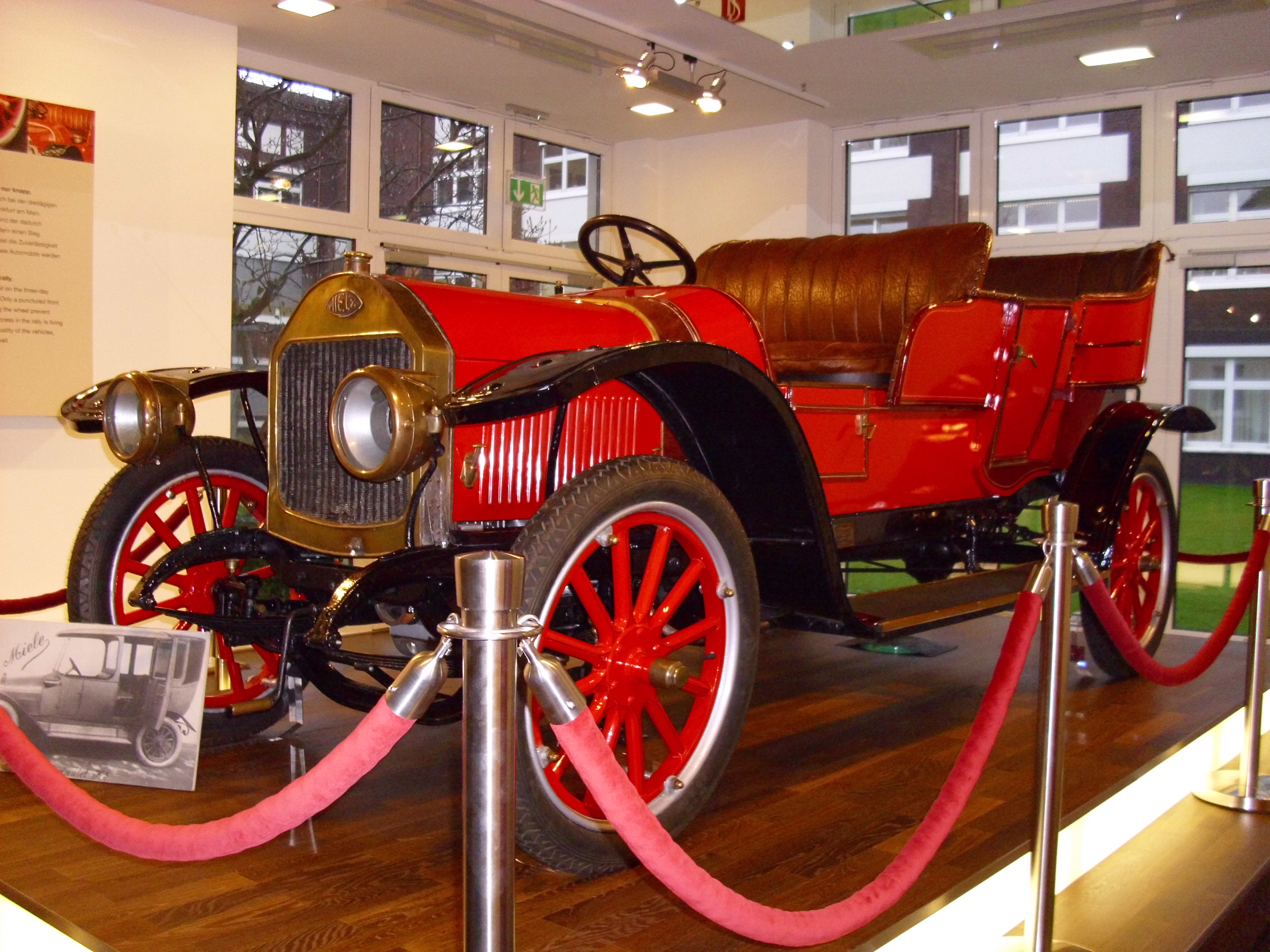
Miele car "K 1" (1913), Miele museum in Gütersloh

Miele produces domestic appliances including laundry appliances; vacuum cleaners; dishwashers; rotary irons; built-in convection, steam, and speed ovens; hobs (cooker hoods, cook tops); free-standing and built-in refrigerators, freezers, and wine coolers; and coffee systems. The company also produces commercial laundry equipment, including wet cleaning machines, lab glassware washers, dental disinfectors, and medical equipment washers.

In 2007, Miele was given an award for being the most successful company in Germany that year, beating the previous year's winner Google, which placed second, and Porsche, which came in third.

Rankings for this Best Brands prize are the result of market research covering key criteria, such as current economic market success and brand recognition and popularity among consumers. Miele was recognized as Best Company and also achieved a top-five place in the category Best Product Brand. Miele was honored as Best Domestic Appliance Brand in the UK by Which? in 2007 and again in 2008, being only one of two brands to win twice in a row. They have since won again in 2010.

In North America, Miele is marketed as a high-end major appliance brand. It competes against brands such as Sub-Zero, Wolf & Cove, Gaggenau, Fulgor, Viking Range, Dacor, Asko, JennAir, and Thermador.

== Manufacturing ==
As of 2026, Miele operated 19 production sites worldwide, with much of its manufacturing based in Germany. Its main factory in Gütersloh produces washing machines and washer-dryers, while the plant in Bielefeld manufactures dishwashers, vacuum cleaners and professional cleaning equipment. Other German facilities produce cooking appliances and components.

The factory in Uničov, Czech Republic, produces all of Miele's domestic tumble dryers and around three-quarters of its dishwashers. In 2026, its managing director reported annual production of approximately 400,000 dryers and 600,000 dishwashers, making Uničov the company's largest factory by appliance output.

Miele also manufactures washing machines in Poland and components in Romania and Austria. In 2024, the company announced plans to move most domestic washing-machine assembly from Gütersloh to its factory in Ksawerów.

Outside Europe, Miele manufactures vacuum cleaners in Dongguan, China. In November 2024, it began producing built-in ovens at a new factory in Opelika, Alabama, its first manufacturing facility in the United States.

== Slogans ==
Miele's slogan in German is immer besser, which literally translates to "always better" but can also mean "getting better and better".
