= Sub-Zero (company) =

American private home appliance company

Sub-Zero Group, Inc.
- Industry: Home appliances
- Founded: August 20, 1945; 81 years ago in Madison, Wisconsin, USA
- Founder: Westye F. Bakke
- Brands: Sub-Zero; Wolf; Cove
- Website: www.subzero-wolf.com

Sub-Zero Group, Inc. is a privately held American company that manufactures and sells luxury kitchen appliances. It sells refrigerators and wine preservation products under the Sub-Zero brand. The company also manufactures kitchen appliances under the Wolf brand and dishwashers under the Cove brand name. Sub-Zero Group is based in Madison, Wisconsin.

== History ==
Wolf logo

Cove logo

Before founding the company, Westye F. Bakke had begun experimenting with refrigeration to develop a freezer capable of storing his son's insulin. He founded the Sub-Zero Freezer Company on August 20, 1945, in Madison, Wisconsin. In 2000, it acquired the domestic appliance line of the Wolf Range Corporation, a California-based manufacturer of professional-style ranges, cooktops and grills for both home and commercial use.

Wolf Appliance Inc., Sub-Zero's corporate companion, expanded the few products acquired from Wolf Range Corporation. It now sells domestic cooking appliances from kitchen stoves, cooktops, wall ovens, warming drawers and ventilation equipment. The company's products compete with those made by Viking, Dacor, Thermador, GE Monogram, KitchenAid, JennAir and Miele.

== Innovations ==
According to the official company history, Bakke invented the first free-standing freezer in 1943. It also claims to have been the first to manufacture built-in refrigerators, beginning in the 1950s,.

== Appliance models ==
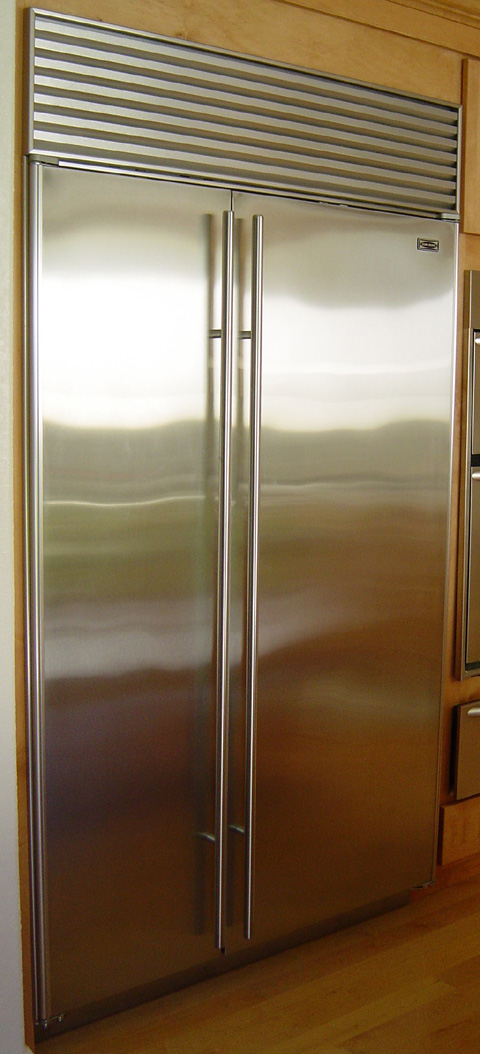
Exterior of a Sub-Zero unit

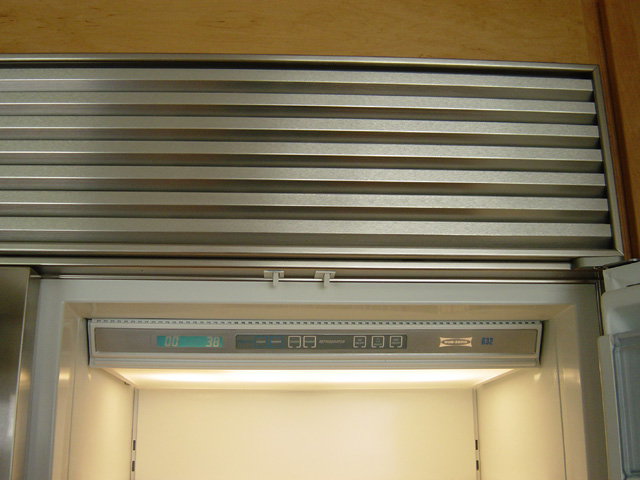
Control console of a Sub-Zero

Sub-Zero manufactures two series of built-in refrigeration as well as wine storage and under counter units. Each refrigerator model usually comes in two variations, namely a stainless steel exterior or a customizable exterior in an overlay or flush inset version. The customizable option allows the buyer to install kitchen cabinet panels on the door(s) to match with the rest of the kitchen. Its refrigerators are designed with a 24-inch (61 cm) depth and can be installed flush with kitchen cabinets of the same standard depth to provide an integrated look.

The Sub-Zero 424 Wine Storage unit has held virtually the same design since the early 1990s. It is the only under-counter wine cooler in its class to be able to keep wine as low as 38 °F (3 °C). It has two temperature zones and can be connected to a house alarm.

A Sub-Zero refrigerator can weigh as much as 800 pounds (360 kg) and require four delivery people to move the refrigerator unit into a kitchen. Most Sub-Zero full-size models are 84 inches (2.1 m) tall and 48 inches (120 cm) wide.

The company has production facilities in Madison, Wisconsin; Phoenix, Arizona; Goodyear, Arizona; Richmond, Kentucky; and Fitchburg, Wisconsin and a forthcoming 400,000 ft^{2} facility in Cedar Rapids, Iowa scheduled to open in 2025.
