= Dacor (kitchen appliances) =

Manufacturer and distributor of kitchen appliances

- Company type: Private
- Industry: Kitchen appliances
- Predecessor: Stanthony corp. (est. 1950)
- Founded: 1965; 61 years ago Pasadena, California U.S.
- Founder: Stanley M. Joseph
- Headquarters: Ridgefield Park, New Jersey, United States
- Area served: United States, Canada, Mexico
- Key people: Soon Choi (CEO); Geraldine Morrison (executive director); Scott Davies (marketing director)
- Products: Ranges, wall ovens, cooktops, ventilation, refrigeration, grills
- Brands: Dacor
- Parent: Samsung Electronics
- Website: www.dacor.com

Dacor (/ˈdeɪkɔːr/ "day-core") is an American company, it is subsidiary of Samsung Electronics America that designs, manufactures and distributes kitchen appliances, specializing in the high-premium product tier, including wall ovens, ranges, cooktops, dishwashers, warming drawers, microwaves, ventilation hoods, refrigerators and wine dispensers. Founded in 1965 by Stanley M. Joseph, the company had been continuously owned and operated by three generations of the Joseph family until it was sold to Samsung in August 2016.

The company's headquarters and 325,000 sq ft (30,200 m^{2}) manufacturing facility were based in City of Industry, California until 2021. It distributes its products throughout the United States, Canada and Mexico, selling directly to over 1,300 dealer showrooms. The company operates a factory showroom in Los Angeles.

== History ==
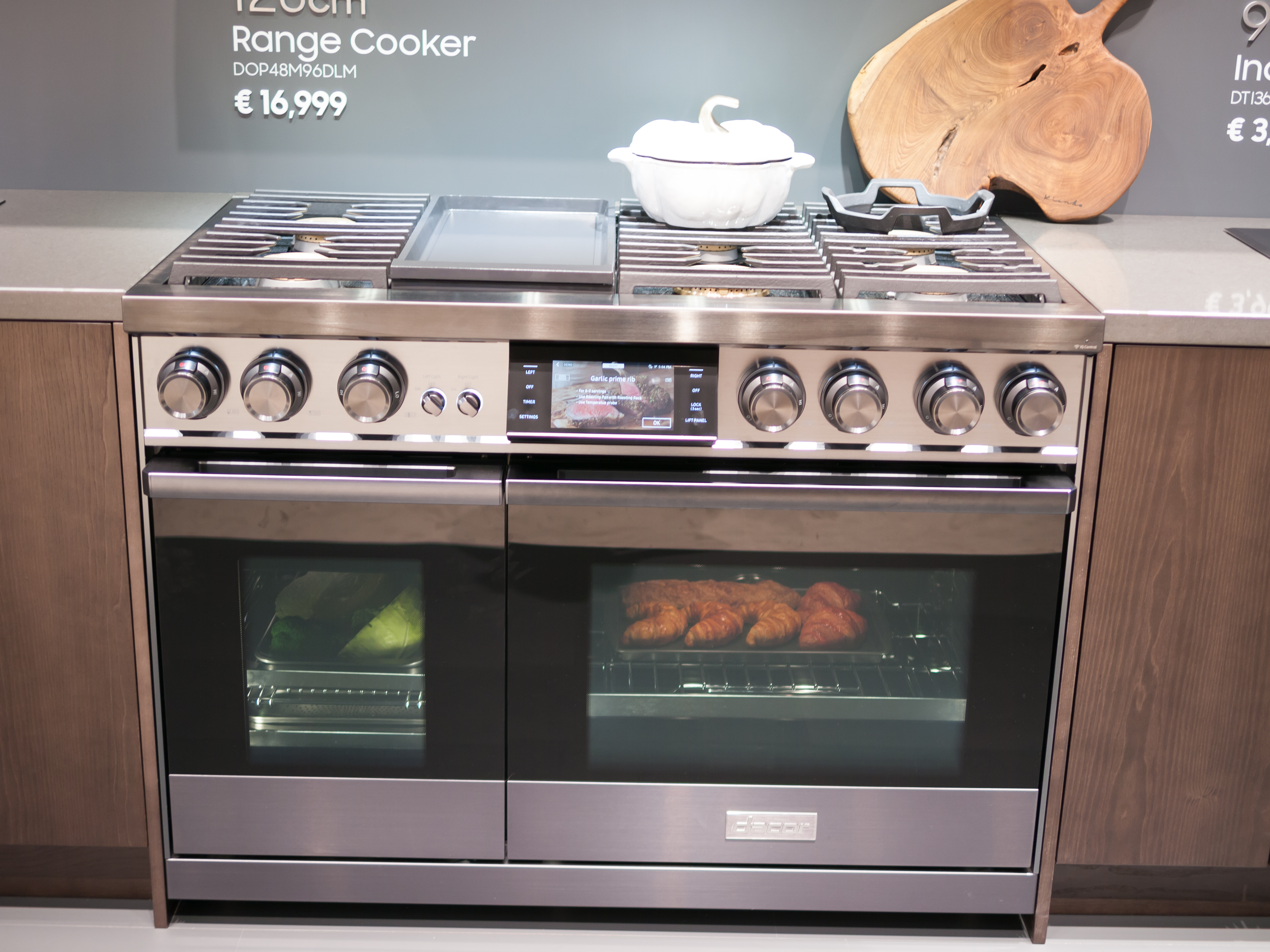
Dacor stove

Stanley M. Joseph started his first business in 1933 when he opened a small retail appliance store in Northern California. He began manufacturing kitchen ventilation hoods with his brother Anthony in 1948, selling them under the name Stanthony. Stanthony Corp was incorporated in 1950.

In 1959, Stanley Joseph was issued United States Patent 2,903,549 for a small electric barbecue unit, the first of its kind, designed for countertop use or to be built into a kitchen counter. He was also awarded a design patent for a combination vent hood and warming oven. The details of Stanley Joseph's early experiences were documented in his book Adventures of a Salesman.

Distinctive Appliances, Incorporated, better known as Dacor, was founded in 1965; Stanley Joseph's sons, Stanford graduates and Vietnam veterans Michael and Anthony, led the company through its second generation, having learned the business from entry-level positions at very young ages. They ultimately purchased the company from him in 1982.

In 1989, Stanley Joseph was inducted as a charter member into the National Kitchen & Bath Association (NKBA) Hall of Fame. His award notes that he developed the first fully self-contained ventilating hood for residential use, under his company name of Stanthony. Stanley Joseph's sons, Michael and Anthony Joseph, were also inducted into the NKBA in 2004; their honor states that they have taken the industry one step further by creating new patents for kitchen appliances. To date, the Joseph family is the only family to have three NKBA Hall of Fame inductees.

In August 2016, the company announced its acquisition by Samsung Electronics America. The sale was closed the following month. According to the company press release, "Dacor will maintain its corporate identity and brand, with no changes to its operations and US-based manufacturing."

== Partnerships ==
In 2010, Dacor began a collaboration with BMW Group DesignworksUSA which led to the introduction of its Distinctive 36” Gas Cooktop, as well as the interface for its Discovery iQ Controller for its top-of-the-line wall ovens.

== Awards ==
To date, the Joseph family is the only family to have three members inducted into the National Kitchen & Bath Association (NKBA) Hall of Fame:

- Stanley Joseph (1989)
- Michael Joseph (2004)
- Anthony Joseph (2004)
