= Bosch (company) =

German engineering and technology company

Robert Bosch GmbH

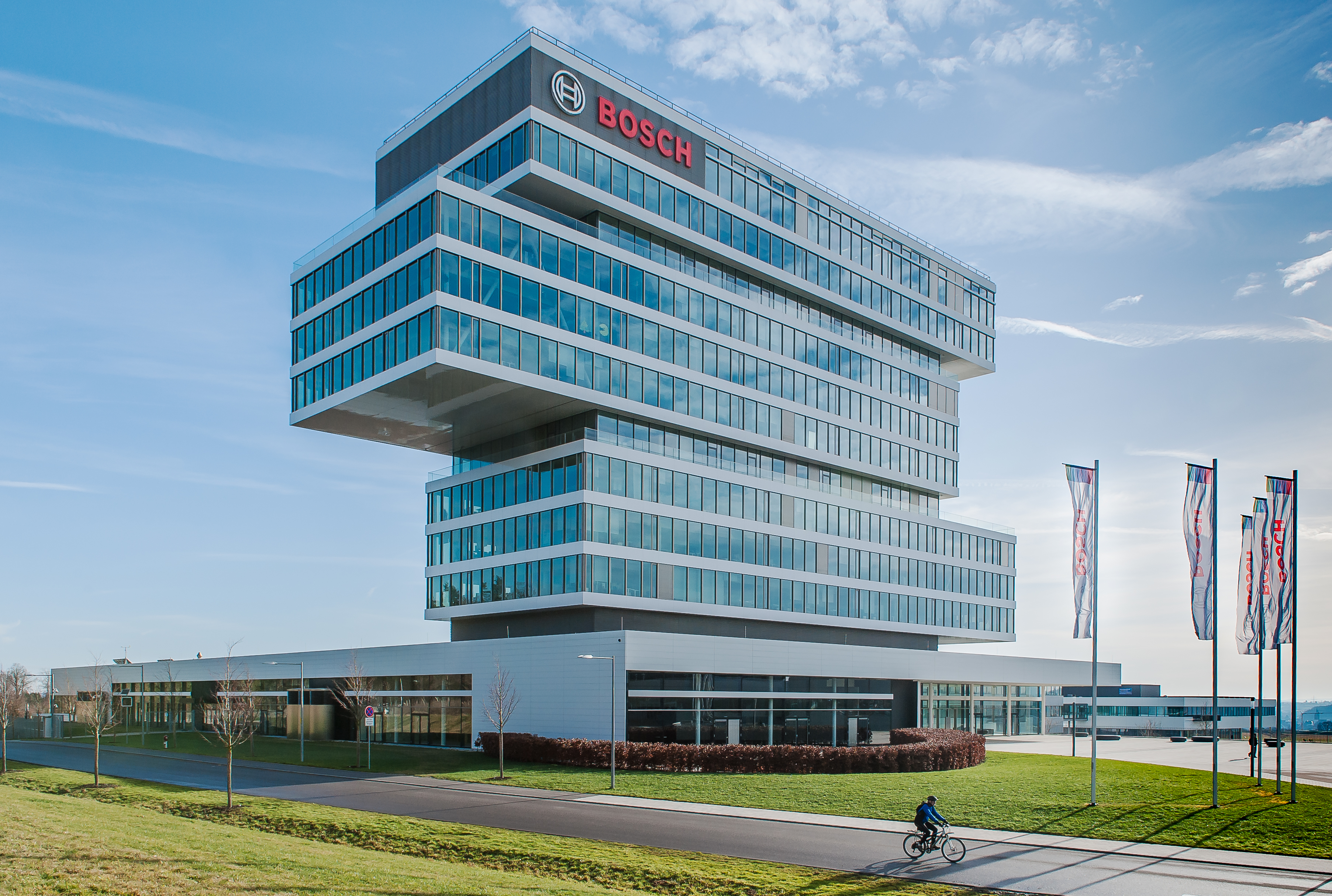
- Corporate Sector Research and Advanced Development in Renningen, Germany
- Type: Private
- Industry: Conglomerate
- Predecessor: Eisemann-Werke; Friedrich Hesser, Maschinenfabrik
- Founded: 15 November 1886; 139 years ago
- Founder: Robert Bosch
- Headquarters: Robert-Bosch-Platz 1, 70839 Gerlingen, Baden-Württemberg, Germany
- Area served: Worldwide
- Key people: Christian Fischer (CEO)
- Products: Automotive parts; power tools; security systems; home appliances; engineering; electronics; cloud computing; IoT; Cycling components
- Revenue: ▼€90.34 billion (2024)
- Operating income: ▼€2.796 billion (2024)
- Net income: ▼€1.332 billion (2024)
- Total assets: ▲€112.76 billion (2024)
- Total equity: ▲€49.99 billion (2024)
- Owners: Robert Bosch Stiftung (94%); Bosch family (5%)
- Number of employees: 417,859 (2024)
- Subsidiaries: Bosch Thermotechnik; BSH Hausgeräte; ETAS; Bosch Rexroth
- Website: www.bosch.com

Robert Bosch GmbH (/bɒʃ/; German: [bɔʃ]), commonly known as Bosch (styled BOSCH), is a German multinational engineering and technology company headquartered in Gerlingen, Baden-Württemberg, Germany. It is 94 percent owned by the Robert Bosch Stiftung, a charitable institution. Although the charity is funded by owning the vast majority of shares, it has no voting rights and is involved in health and social causes unrelated to Bosch's business.

The company was founded by Robert Bosch in Stuttgart in 1886. In the late 1890s, Bosch started installing magneto ignition devices into vehicles; the automotive sector would be a key long term market for the firm. In 1901, Bosch opened its first factory in Stuttgart. In 1917, it was reorganised as a corporation. Prior to the First World War, the company generated 92 percent of its sales outside of Germany, however, Bosch lost most of its international holdings following the conflict. Using a combination of loans and a greater focus on business acumen at the board level, the firm quickly rebuilt its international presence during the interwar period, particularly in South America and Asia. Diversification efforts in the 1930s included the purchase of a gas appliances production facility, the development of an electric drill, electric refrigerator, and car radio.

Both prior and during the Second World War, the company had links to the ruling Nazi Party, using thousands of forced labourers in its production plants to produce ammunition and outfit Luftwaffe aircraft as part of the German war effort during the Second World War. Despite having to cooperate with the party, Robert Bosch formed a secret organisation that was focused on resistance to the Nazi Party, who were involved in a failed attempt to assassinate Hitler in 1944. At the end of WWII, all of Bosch's foreign assets were seized and most employees were laid off, however, the firm quickly recovered on the back of strong economic performance within West Germany. An economic downturn in 1966 motivated Bosch to adopt a strategy of decentralisation, diversification, and overseas expansion. The end of the Cold War led to the company expanding across the former Eastern Bloc, setting up new manufacturing facilities and subsidiaries across Eastern Europe.

Bosch's core operating areas are spread across four business sectors: mobility (hardware and software), consumer goods (including household appliances and power tools), industrial technology (including drive and control), and energy and building technology. By the 21st century, Bosch had become the largest automotive supplier in the world. Due to this, the company's fiscal performance has often been impacted by trends impacting the automotive sector. In 2025, Bosch experienced a substantial drop in profitability that was attributed to a decline in global German car sales.

== History ==
=== 1886–1920 ===
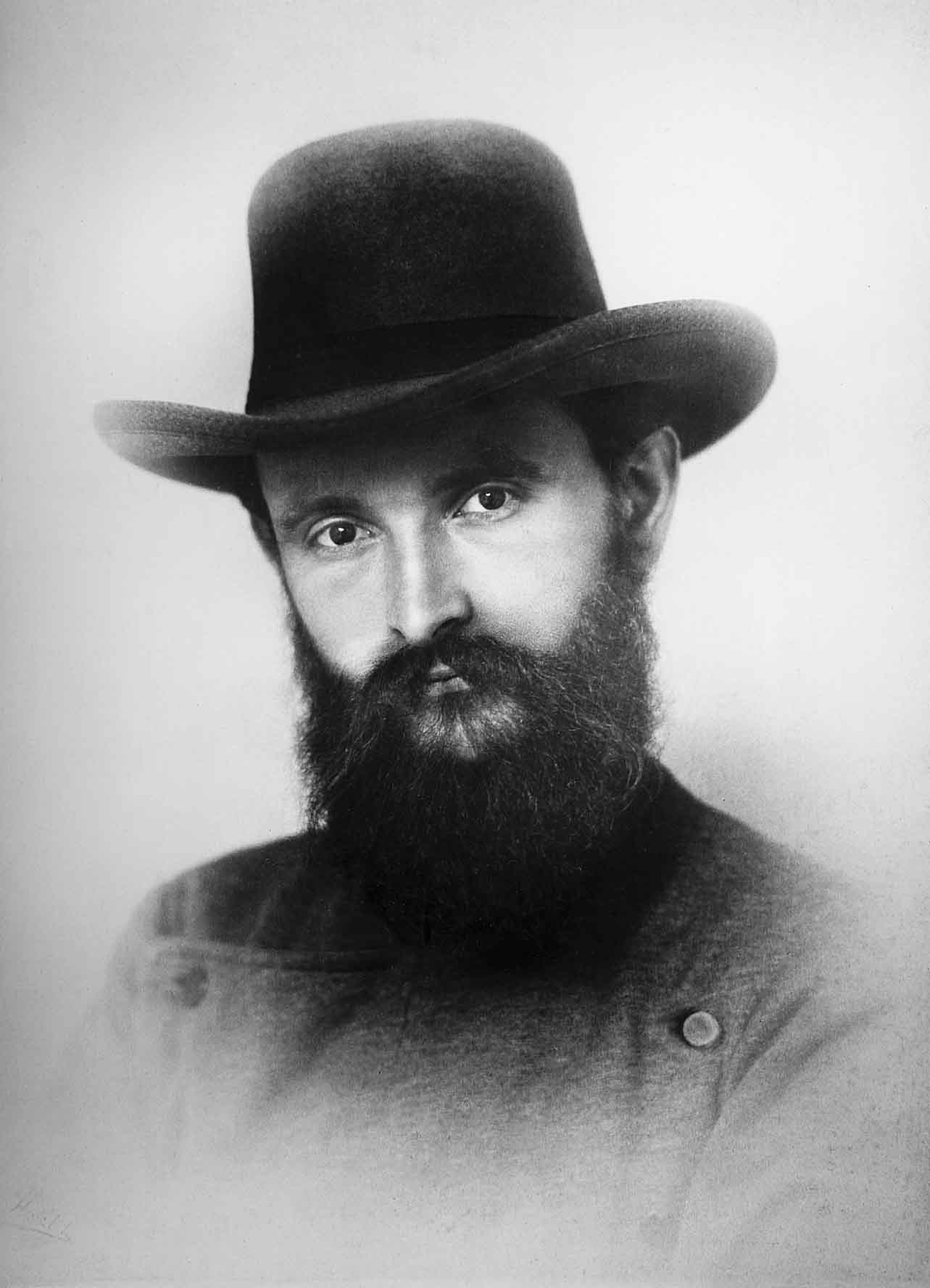
Robert Bosch, founder of the company

The company began in Stuttgart-West as the Werkstätte für Feinmechanik und Elektrotechnik (Workshop for Precision Mechanics and Electrical Engineering) on 15 November 1886. At the time of its founding, Stuttgart lacked municipal electricity, which hampered the business's early opportunities and pushed it near to bankruptcy before the local authority announced the decision to build a power station to serve the city in 1893. In 1897, Bosch started installing magneto ignition devices into automobiles, an early step towards becoming a key supplier of ignition systems over time. In 1902, the chief engineer at Bosch, Gottlob Honold, unveiled the high-voltage magneto ignition system with a spark plug.

In 1901, Bosch opened its first factory in Stuttgart. In 1906, the company produced its 100,000th magneto. In the same year, Bosch introduced the eight-hour day for workers. In 1910, the Feuerbach plant was founded near Stuttgart, where Bosch began producing generators and headlights (Bosch-Light) in 1914. The motorization of road traffic led to the company's rapid growth after 1900. Bosch had a workforce of 45 in 1901, which expanded to more than 1,000 employees by 1908.

Bosch's international development began in 1898 with the opening of a branch in London, followed the next year by outlets in Paris, Vienna, and Budapest. By 1909, Bosch was represented by trading partners on every continent. Bosch opened the first factory outside Germany in Paris in 1905 and the first on another continent in 1912 in Springfield, Massachusetts (USA). In 1913, Bosch founded an apprentice workshop to recruit young people for the production of automotive electrics. Prior to the First World War, the company generated 92 percent of its sales outside of Germany.

In 1913, the company was subject to industrial action over employees being laid off as a result of a reduction in orders received. As the labour dispute escalated, Robert Bosch terminated all agreements between the company and trade unions and joined the metal industry employers’ association. The dispute was only healed by the First World War. In 1917, Bosch was transformed into a corporation and remained so until 1937, when Robert Bosch regained sole ownership by purchasing back his shares. In the process, the company became a limited liability company (GmbH).

=== 1921–1945 ===
In the aftermath of the First World War, Bosch was compelled to forfeit the majority of its international holdings, including its US factories. Thus, the company opted to rebuild its global activities throughout much of the interwar period, which included expansion in both South America and Asia. In 1922, Illies & Company established a sales office for Bosch in Calcutta, India. In the years that followed, Bosch concluded contracts in Asia with sales partners in Malaysia, Singapore, Thailand, and Indonesia, as well as on the American continents with partners in Mexico, Peru, Colombia, and Ecuador.

In the 1920s, Bosch expanded its product range to include numerous automotive technology products essential for cars, such as electric horns (1921), windshield wipers (1926), and direction indicators ("trafficator", 1927). Robert Bosch personally led the project to develop a diesel injection pump, which went into production in late 1927. To fuel the company's expansion plans, loans were taken out and the company's management board was restructured around business interests over technical ones.

Growth proved to be somewhat unsteady, occasional sharp short-term downturns in demand would sometimes necessitate drastic cuts; between September 1925 and September 1926, roughly 5,600 associates, almost half of Bosch's employees, were laid off. The company was deeply impacted by the Great Depression, nessitating numerous lay offs, salary reductions, and the implementation of reduced working hours. Bosch pursued a strategy of diversification, which was achieved both through completing acquisitions and the launching of products into new markets.

Bosch purchased the gas appliances production facility from Junkers & Co. in 1932. In 1932, the company developed its first electric drill and presented its first car radio. In 1933, Bosch introduced its first electric refrigerator for private households.

==== During the Nazi regime ====
Like most German businesses at the time, Bosch had links to the ruling Nazi Party. Robert Bosch had commented on Hitler, after their first meeting in the early 1930s that "He wants to be a statesman and doesn't even know what justice is" and had to balance holding opposing views to the Nazi Party, whilst having to cooperate with them.

Prior to the Second World War, Bosch under the direction of the Nazi Party began relocating armament production to Germany's interior. Bosch founded two factories in 1935 and 1937: Dreilinden Maschinenbau GmbH in Kleinmachnow and Feinmechanische Industrie GmbH (later Trillke-Werke GmbH) in Hildesheim, for armament production. These factories were built secretly and in close cooperation with the Nazi authorities. In 1937, Bosch AG became a limited liability company (GmbH).

The Bosch subsidiary Dreilinden Maschinenbau GmbH (DLMG) in Kleinmachnow employed around 5,000 people, more than half of whom were forced labourers, prisoners of war, and female concentration camp prisoners, including many women from the Warsaw Uprising. During the Second World War, there were at least 3,000 workers in the mechanics division at the Bosch Hildesheim factory, almost all of them from nearby occupied countries; there were only 200 recorded German workers. In the last years of the conflict, all new German tanks included starter elements from the Bosch factory in Hildesheim; the company also had a monopoly position in the outfitting of Luftwaffe aircraft.

The company's cooperation with the ruling party was not without resistance. They formed a group known as the Bosch Kreis, which included Bosch executives, and were involved in resistance activities against the Nazi Party, including participation in a plan to assassinate Hitler, in July 1944, which was unsuccessful.

=== 1946–1999 ===
At the end of the conflict, the company was compelled to stop production, causing nearly all of its workforce to lose their jobs, while all foreign assets were seized and foreign markets remained closed to Bosch for years. It opted to enter new markets during the 1950s, including mobile hydraulics, medical electronics, and radio technology. Between the late 1940s and the mid 1960s, the firm benefitted from strong economic performance within West Germany. Following an economic downturn in 1966, management sought to avoid layoffs by adopting a strategy of decentralisation, diversification, and overseas expansion. The efforts included early work on research projects into emerging technologies, such as integrated circuits, electronically controlled fuel injection, and anti-lock braking systems (ABS). This research led to a major milestone in 1978, when Bosch and Mercedes-Benz jointly introduced an electronically controlled anti-lock braking system, one of the first to reach series production, launching it in the Mercedes-Benz S-Class. In the 1980s, Bosch entered the telecommunications sector, producing technology for satellites and mobile phones.

The company did not record a single operating loss throughout the Cold War era.The end of the Cold War and the fall of the Iron Curtain opened valuable opportunities to Bosch. By 1994, it had subsidiary companies across 13 countries of the former Eastern Bloc; the company also established manufacturing plants in the Czech Republic, Poland, Hungary, and the Russian Federation. In 1990, 49 percent of Bosch's sales were generated inside Germany, by 2000, 72 percent of sales came from outside Germany. Additionally, an early 1990s slump in the European automotive sector and an intense period of price-oriented competition against other suppliers negatively impacted Bosch. In response to lost orders, reduced working hours were enacted for 20,000 Germany-based associates, along with early retirement arrangements and termination agreements, which collectively involved around 13,000 employees.

=== 21st century ===
In 2001, Bosch acquired Mannesmann Rexroth AG, which they later renamed to Bosch Rexroth AG. In the same year, the company opened a new testing center in Vaitoudden, close to Arjeplog in north Sweden. A new development center for automotive engineering, in Abstatt, Germany was constructed shortly after. In 2002, Bosch acquired Philips CSI, which at the time was manufacturing a broad range of professional communication and security products and systems including CCTV, congress, and public address systems. In the 2000s the company developed the electric hydraulic brake, common rail fuel injection with piezo-injectors, digital car radio with a disc drive, and the cordless screwdriver with a lithium-ion battery in 2003. In 2004, Bosch bought Sigpack Systems from SIG.

Bosch received the Deutsche Zukunftspreis ('German Future Prize') from the German president in 2005 and 2008. A new development center was planned in 2008 in Renningen. In 2014, the first departments moved to the new center, while the remaining departments followed in 2015. In 2006, Bosch acquired Telex Communications and Electro-Voice. In 2009, Bosch invested about €3.6 billion in research and development. Approximately 3,900 patents are published per year. In addition to increasing energy efficiency by employing renewable energies, the company plans to invest in new areas such as biomedical engineering.

- 2012: Purchased SPX Service Solutions
- 2012: Bosch sold its foundation brakes activities to KPS Capital Partners, which led to the establishment of Chassis Brakes International
- 2013: Bosch announced it would exit its solar business
- 2014: Bosch takes over 100% of the shares from the former BSH Bosch and Siemens Hausgeräte GmbH joint venture (home appliances)
- 2014: Bosch received the 2014 US Smart Partner award for Physical Security from Ingram Micro
- 2015: Bosch takes over 100% of the shares of the former ZF Lenksysteme (Steering Systems) GmbH joint venture (was 50/50 with ZF Friedrichshafen)
- 2015: Bosch purchases Seeo, Inc, a start-up working on solid-state lithium-ion batteries

In May 2019, Bosch said it planned to reach carbon neutrality by 2020 by investing in clean electricity and a carbon offset program. In July 2019, Bosch sold its packaging machinery business unit to CVC Capital Partners, which was subsequently rebranded to Syntegon. Bosch has formed a strategic alliance with the Technische Universität Darmstadt. In the first quarter of 2020, Bosch was certified as being carbon neutral, across more than 400 sites, worldwide. In 2020, Bosch funded the creation of a report entitled Decarbonising Road Transport: There Is No Silver Bullet, which contained disputed information about the environmental performance of electric vehicles.

In January 2021, Volkswagen filed a US$1.2-billion class-action against Bosch and Continental AG in the United States after VW was forced to reduce production due to a lack of automotive microchips. On 26 January 2021, the US Court of Appeals for the Ninth Circuit affirmed that Bosch won on all claims. In June 2021, Bosch opened a newly built semiconductor manufacturing plant in which it invested US$1.2 billion, its largest-ever spending on a single project. In April 2022, Bosch acquired Five.ai, a vehicular automation startup. Also in April 2022, Bosch acquired Arioso Systems, a Dresden-based MEMS micro speaker producer, added to Bosch Sensortec GmbH.

In July 2022, Bosch announced plans to invest €3 billion into its semiconductor chip production and research and development (R&D) over the next four years, including opening new facilities for manufacturing a computer chip development in Dresden and Reutlingen. China is both a market and a manufacturing location for Bosch. In 2023, Bosch had 58,000 employees in China and group sales of CNY 139.1 billion. In September 2023, Bosch acquired TSI Semiconductors, a Roseville-headquartered silicon carbide (SiC) power device manufacturer.

Beginning in 2022, Bosch faced allegations of violating international sanctions during the Russian invasion of Ukraine after Ukrainian authorities reported finding Bosch components in Russian military vehicles. Reports in 2024 have suggested that Bosch, along with other companies, have been selling appliances intended for the Ukrainian market in Russia.

In August 2025, Bosch acquired the heating and air conditioning operations of Johnson Controls for US$8 billion. In September 2025, the company announced plans to cut 13,000 jobs at its auto parts business, representing 3 percent of its global workforce, in stages by 2030 as it relies more on artificial intelligence. Bosch won the German Future Prize again in late 2025, for developing a zero-emission fuel-cell power module to power heavy vehicles. The system transforms hydrogen and oxygen to electrical energy, emitting only water vapor, when using green hydrogen.

In January 2026, the company was reported to be among the top 30 global investors into R&D in 2025, while the Bosch Group's profits had reduced by almost half in the same fiscal year, with more than 20,000 job cuts in Germany by 2030, primarily in the mobility division.

==== Emission software ====
In 2006, Volkswagen asked Bosch for help in developing software for their emission defeat devices. Volkswagen is one of Bosch's biggest customers. Volkswagen engineers provided specifications to Bosch, who wrote the code. Bosch was concerned about the legality of the software and asked Volkswagen to assume responsibility if the fraud was discovered, but Volkswagen refused. Starting in 2008, Bosch supplied 17 million motor control and mixture control devices containing illegal software to various manufacturers, domestically and globally. The automobiles fitted with Bosch's devices emitted more nitrogen oxides than allowed under regulations. On 1 February 2017, Bosch agreed to pay US consumers US$327.5 million as compensation for its role in devising the software. Bosch also provided emissions software for over 100,000 Fiat Chrysler's 3.0 L V6 diesel engine and Grand Cherokee SUVs and agreed to pay affected consumers US$27.5 million as part of a broader settlement in January 2019. In May 2019, Bosch paid another US$100-million fine for its connection to the Dieselgate scandal.

== Business divisions ==
=== Mobility ===
The mobility division is the largest, in terms of revenue. The Bosch 2024 global annual report, showed that this division accounted for 61% of global revenues of €90.3 billion. This division creates solutions for vehicles and fleet management, developing software, vehicle electronics, logistics management solutions, driver assistance and safety systems and vehicle energy systems such as thermal performance. The mobility division is active in powertrain systems, but has evolved to include hydrogen storage, electric propulsion, automated driving and connectivity.

Since 2022, this division is going through a comprehensive transformation process due to rapid technological advancements that are affecting the sector. Bosch Mobility is developing advanced driver assistance system software, cameras and sensors that they are overlaying with artificial intelligence. In 2025, this divisions production was affected by geo-political decisions that led to exports of Nexperia's finished products being banned, which affected the supply chain of the automotive sector. In December 2025, Bosch Mobility announced an AI extension platform, developed with technology partners, that allows existing vehicle cockpit systems to be upgraded to incorporate advanced AI without the requirement to change existing hardware and system infrastructure.

=== Consumer goods ===
Consumer Goods contributed 22% of total Bosch Group sales in 2024. The Consumer Goods business division includes BSH Hausgeräte GmbH, which offers energy-efficient, and increasingly connected household appliances. Its products include washing machines, tumble dryers, refrigerators, freezers, stoves and ovens, and dishwashers. Small appliances include vacuum cleaners, coffee makers, and food processors. BSH Hausgerate is the largest manufacturer of home appliances in Europe. Bosch appliances are sometimes considered best-in-breed, such as evaluation of dishwashers in 2025 where Bosch-brand machines took the top 4 (and top 5 of 6) evaluations by Consumer Reports.

The Professional and DIY Power Tools division manufactures power tools and accessories, and measuring technology. This includes tools such as hammer drills, cordless screwdrivers and jigsaws. This division also makes gardening equipment such as lawnmowers, hedge trimmers, and high-pressure cleaners. One of the division's focal points is high-performance cordless tools. In 2019, they were ranked as the largest power tools manufacturer in the world, based on 2018 revenue. In 2025, Bosch announced it would close two of the power tools manufacturing sites based in Germany in 2026 due to economic factors affecting the construction sector and consumer confidence, with production moving to alternative locations to improve efficiency. Bosch is also a manufacturer of electric bicycles, offering motors and systems connected to e-bikes such as batteries, displays, and digital services. The eBike Systems division was established in 2009.

Brands in this sector include Dremel, Siemens (under licence), Constructa-Neff, Gaggenau Hausgeräte, and Thermador.

=== Energy and building technology ===
The Energy and Building Technology business sector generated €7.5 billion of total Bosch Group sales in 2024. Its Building Technologies division (formerly Security Systems) has two areas of business: the global product business for security and communications, and the regional integrator business. The latter offers services for building security, energy efficiency, and building automation in selected countries. Both units focus on commercial applications. The products encompass video surveillance, intrusion detection, fire detection, and voice-alarm systems, as well as access control and professional audio and conference systems.

The Thermotechnik GmbH Thermotechnology division offers systems for air conditioning, hot water, and decentralized energy management. It provides heating systems and energy management for residential buildings, water heaters, and commercial and industrial heating and air-conditioning systems. The Bosch Global Service Solutions division offers outsourcing for business processes and services, primarily for customers in the automotive, travel, and logistics industries and in information and communications technology. Within Bosch, it also provides shared-service functions. Robert Bosch Smart Home GmbH offers web-enabled, app-controlled products for the home. Brands within this sector included Dynacord, Telex, Worcester Bosch, Electro-Voice, and Junkers. In 2025, the security/communications/conference systems business unit, which included brands Electro-Voice and Dynacord, was sold to Triton Partners, an investment firm, based in Duke Street, London to be operated as Keenfinity Group.

=== Industrial technology ===
In 2024, the Industrial Technology business sector generated roughly 7% of total Bosch Group sales. The sector includes the Drive and Control Technology division, whose products include customized drive, control, and linear motion for factory automation, plant construction and engineering, and mobile machinery. In addition, the Bosch Connected Industry business unit, which develops software and carries out Industry 4.0 projects for internal and external customers, has been part of the Industrial Technology business sector since the start of 2018.

Bosch Rexroth sits within this division and has a "focus on hydraulics, automation, and additional manufacturing technologies". In 2025, Bosch Rexroth was partnering with Hyroad Energy and GenH2, to develop a "zero-loss liquid hydrogen refueling station in the United States", which will utilise Bosch Rexroth's Liquid Hydrogen CryoPump technology.

=== Other business areas ===
The Bosch Group operates in other business areas that are not assigned to a particular sector. Bosch Healthcare Solutions GmbH is a wholly owned subsidiary of Robert Bosch GmbH, established in 2015, that provides products and services in the area of healthcare and medical technology. In March 2020, Bosch Healthcare developed a COVID-19 testing tool that provided results within two and a half hours that was performed directly at the point of care.

The Grow Platform GmbH is the legal entity of Grow and a 100% subsidiary of the Bosch corporation. Grow is an internal start-up incubator. This has been renamed Bosch Business Innovations, is led by Axel Deniz and aims to build up to 20 new start-ups by 2030. Robert Bosch Venture Capital GmbH (Rbvc, also known as Bosch Ventures) is the corporate venture capital company of the Bosch Group. RBVC invests worldwide in innovative start-up companies. Its investment activities focus on technology companies working in areas of business of current and future relevance for Bosch, above all, automation and electrification, energy efficiency, enabling technologies, and healthcare systems. RBVC also invests in services and business models as well as new materials that are relevant to the above-mentioned areas of business.

== Locations ==
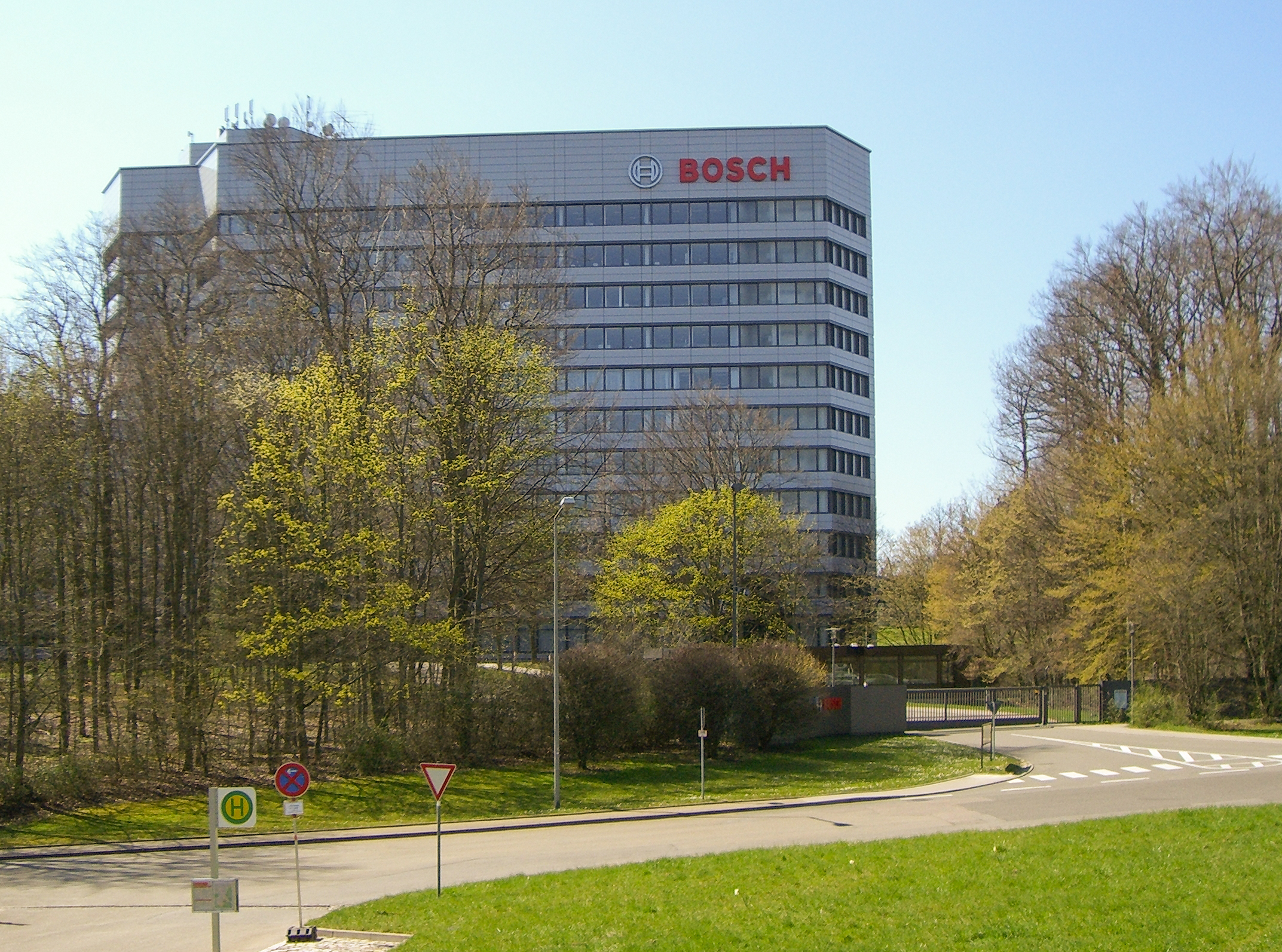
Headquarters in Gerlingen, Germany

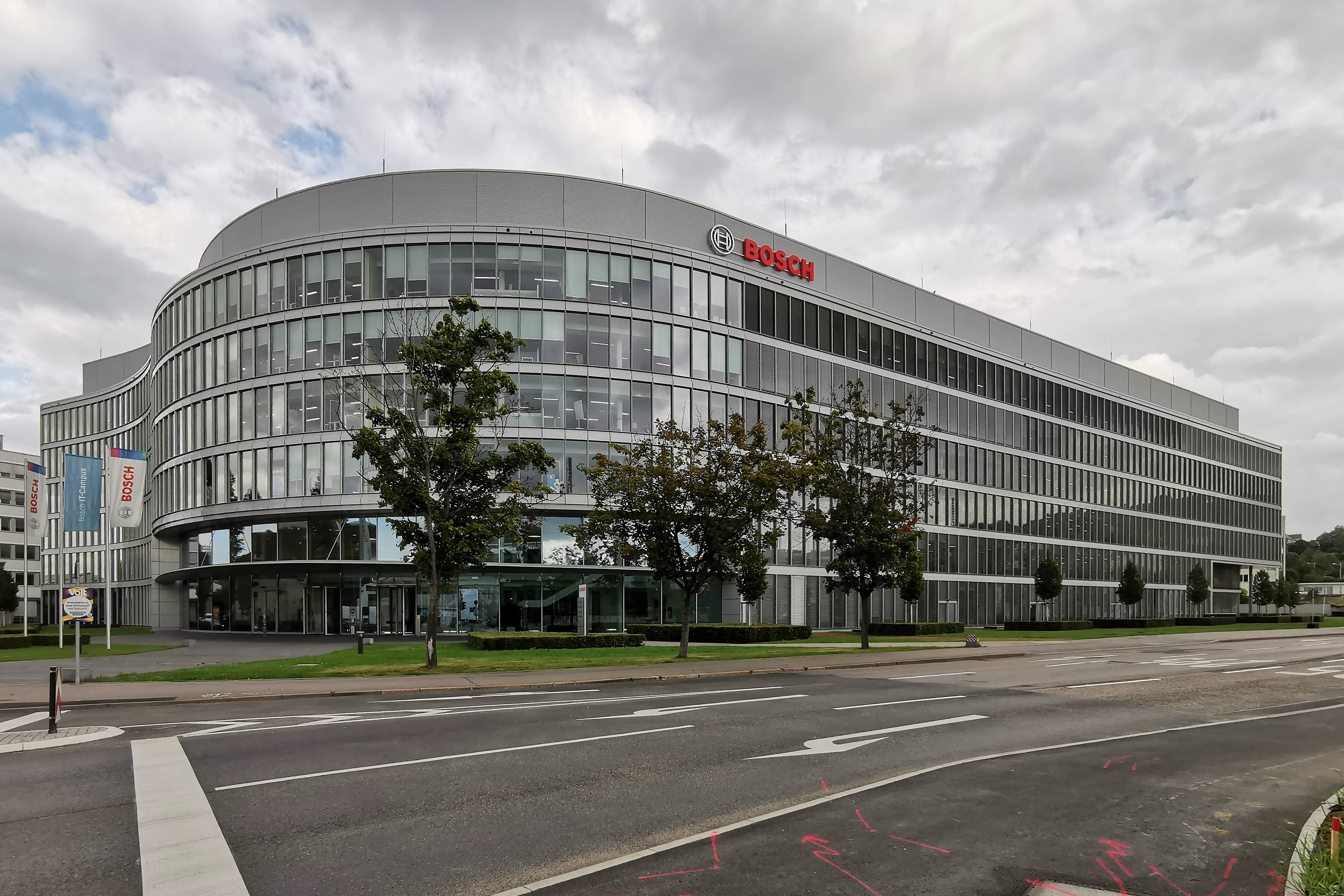
IT campus in Stuttgart-Feuerbach, Germany

Through a complex network of over 468 subsidiaries and regional entities, the company operates in over 60 countries worldwide. Including sales and service partners, Bosch's global manufacturing, engineering, and sales network covers nearly every country in the world. At 125 locations across the globe, Bosch employs roughly 90,100 associates in research and development.

=== China ===
Bosch's Chinese headquarters are in Shanghai. In 2025, the company generated sales of CNY 149.8 billion in China and employed approximately 57,000 people, including more than 10,000 in research and development. In April 2026, Bosch reported operating 38 production sites and 28 research and development centres in China.

The Mobility business generated CNY 122.3 billion in Chinese sales in 2025, with more than half coming from Chinese vehicle manufacturers. Xiaomi used Bosch components in its first car, the SU7, including the braking system, battery-management system and a 400-volt electric axle. In February 2026, Bosch signed a cooperation agreement with Nio covering chassis systems, battery management and other vehicle components across the Nio, Onvo and Firefly brands.

In March 2026, Bosch obtained a licence to test vehicles with Level 3 automated-driving functions on public roads in Wuxi. The company also works with WeRide on driver-assistance technology, combining WeRide's driving algorithms with Bosch's automotive computing hardware. By July 2026, their jointly developed system was undergoing road testing and adaptation in Germany, France and Japan.

=== Americas ===
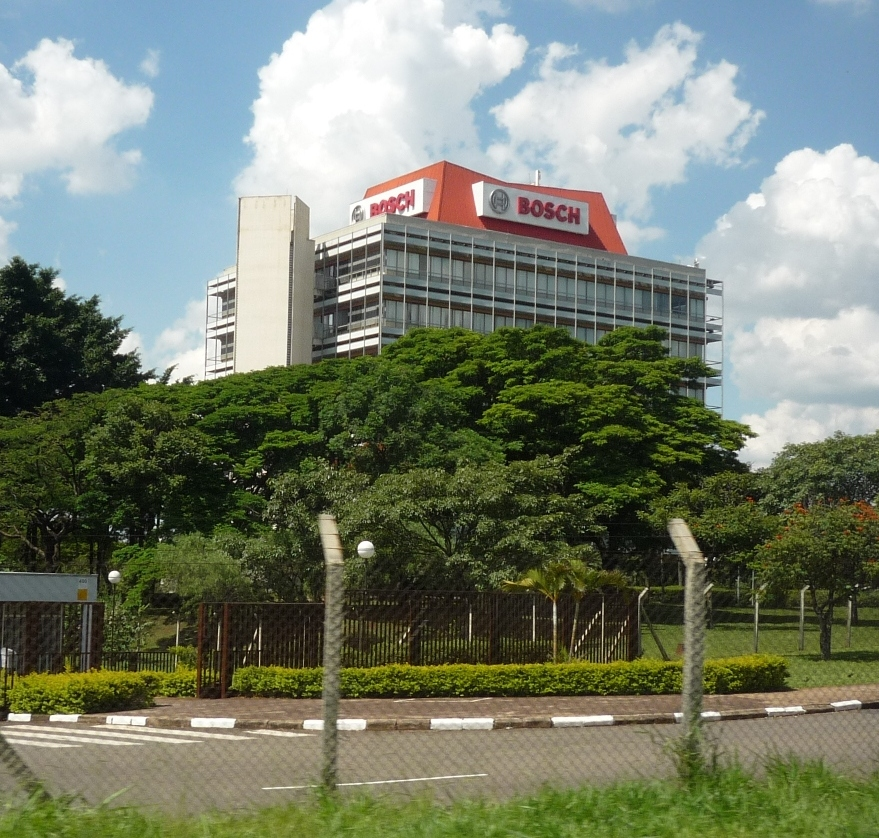
Company headquarters in Latin America located in Brazil

In North America, Robert Bosch LLC (a wholly owned Bosch subsidiary) has corporate headquarters in Farmington Hills, Michigan and Plymouth, Michigan. Three Research Technology Centers are located in Pittsburgh, Pennsylvania, Sunnyvale, California, and Cambridge, Massachusetts. Factories and distribution facilities are located in Mt. Prospect, Illinois; Hoffman Estates, Illinois; Broadview, Illinois; Kentwood, Michigan; Warren, Michigan; Owatonna, Minnesota; Waltham, Massachusetts; Clarksville, Tennessee; Anderson, South Carolina; Charleston, South Carolina; New Bern, North Carolina; and 11 other cities. There are also two corporate sites in Brazil and ten in Mexico. A central purchasing office for all divisions of Bosch Group is located in Broadview, Illinois. In North America, Bosch employs about 41,000 people in over 100 locations, generating US$17.4 billion in annual sales.

In May 2015, Bosch Security Systems opened a distribution center in Greer, South Carolina. The distribution center adds more than 50 new associates in the state and will receive, store and ship more than 50,000 different products for video surveillance, intrusion and fire detection, access control and management systems and professional audio and conference systems. In 2017, Bosch launched its first co-creation IoT innovation space in the world, the Connectory. A partnership with 1871, it is located within the Merchandise Mart in downtown Chicago, Illinois.

=== India ===
Bosch entered India in 1922, when Illies & Company set up a sales office in Calcutta. For three decades, the company operated in the Indian market only through imports. In 1951, the Motor Industries Company Ltd. (MICO) was founded, with Bosch instantly buying 49% of its stock. MICO became the sole distributor and, after the Indian state implemented restrictive import regulations, a factory was set up at Adugodi, Bangalore in 1953, to manufacture various products with Bosch licensing. From this point onward, vocational training took place as well, culminating in the creation of a Vocational Centre in 1960. By 1961, 2,000 people worked at the Bangalore plant, which had already started an export business, and 57.5% of MICO shares had been bought by Bosch. This was followed by increased investments into MICO plants in India in the late 1960s and early 1970s; a second plant was installed in Nasik in 1969–1971, and a third in Naganathapura in 1988. In the late 1980s, the second-largest contingent of Bosch employees outside of Germany was based in India until eventually, in 2008, MICO was renamed Bosch Limited.

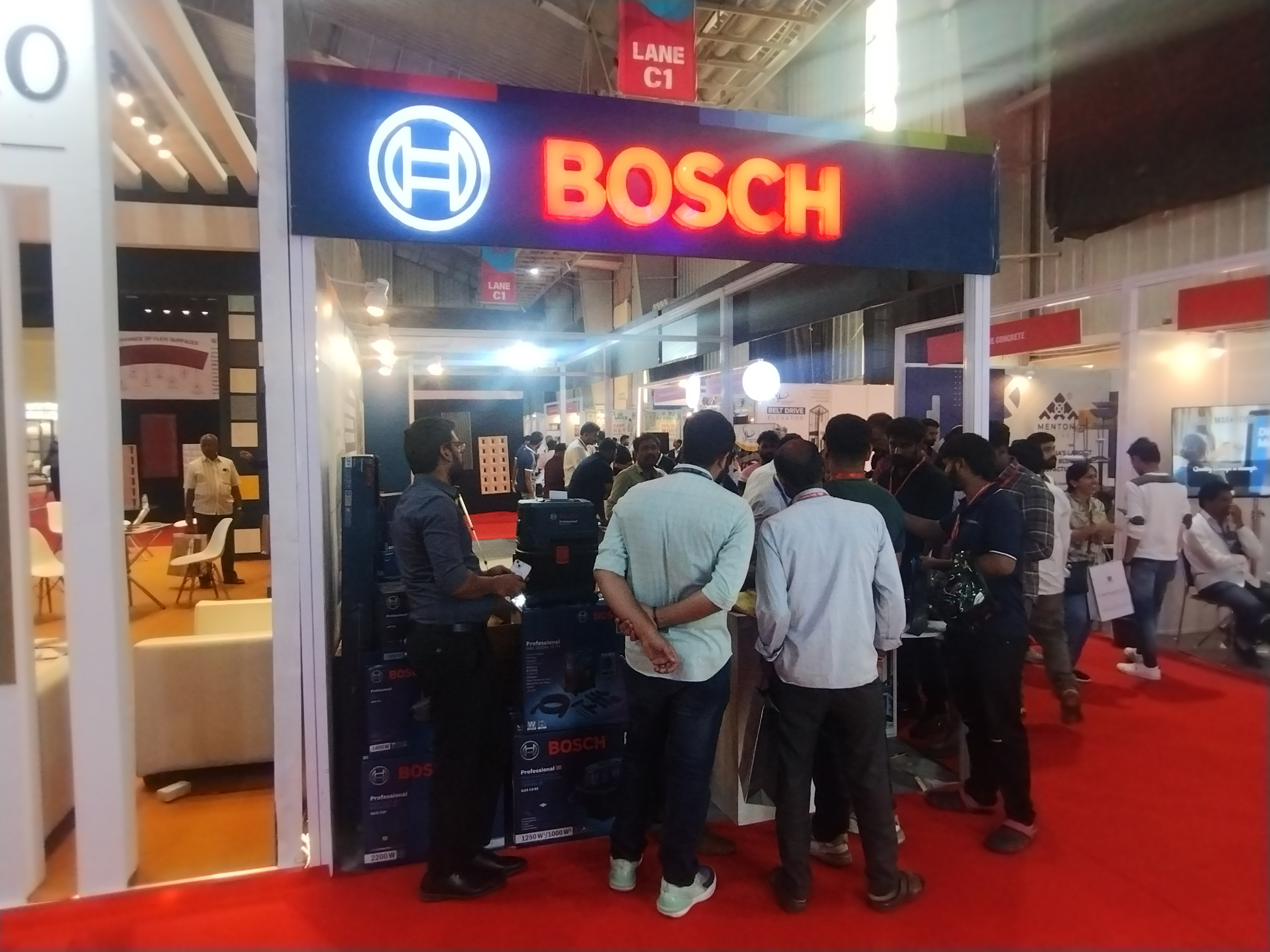
Bosch at Acetech 2025, Bangalore

Bosch India has a turnover of over US$3 billion and over 31,000 employees spread across 10 locations and 7 application development centers. Approximately 84% of Bosch India revenues come from its automotive business, with the remaining 16% split between its non-automotive businesses that include packaging, energy and building, power tools, and consumer retail. Bosch also has R&D facilities in Pune, Hyderabad, Coimbatore, and Bangalore, India. This is Bosch's largest R&D operation outside its home market of Germany. In September 2014, Bosch announced the launch of a locally developed eye-irrigation fluid in India. The company's new eye screening and detection system offers a combination of hardware and software and provides affordable eye care. Bosch India is listed on the Indian stock exchanges and has a market capitalization of over US$12 billion. In 2022, Bosch's engineering and software arm Robert Bosch Engineering and Business Solutions (abbreviated as RBEI), changed its name to Bosch Global Software Technologies.

=== Hungary ===
Bosch employed about 16,800 people in Hungary at the end of 2025 and spent HUF 127 billion on research and development. Its Budapest Engineering Center is Bosch's second-largest European R&D location by number of automotive engineers. Engineers there develop electric motors, power electronics, charging systems and driver-assistance functions.

The company's main manufacturing locations are Hatvan, Maklár and Miskolc. The Hatvan plant makes automotive electronics and expanded production of inverters, power modules and charging converters for electric and hybrid vehicles in 2025. Maklár produces steering systems. In Miskolc, Bosch develops and manufactures eBike drives, batteries and automotive components, including cooling fans and thermal-management valves.

=== Britain ===
In the UK, Bosch has its corporate head office in Denham, Buckinghamshire, and employs circa. 6,300 people. There are 30 Bosch Group locations throughout the country, including 10 manufacturing sites. Alongside sales and support functions for all Bosch business sectors in the region, the company also manufactures boiler systems, mobile hydraulics, as well as packaging machinery alongside lawn and garden products in the UK. In March 2019, Bosch opened its London Connectory, a Shoreditch-based "co-innovation space" open to partners from the public, private, and academic sectors, from start-ups to multinational organizations.

== Subsidiaries ==
=== BSH Hausgeräte ===
BSH Hausgeräte GmbH, in which Bosch acquired all shares in 2014, is one of the world's leading companies in the household appliances industry. In Europe, BSH is the biggest home appliance manufacturer. It includes the principal brand names Bosch, Siemens, Gaggenau, Balay, Neff, Thermador, Constructa, Viva and Ufesa and some regional brands. Bosch household appliances for the North American market are mainly manufactured at its factory near New Bern, North Carolina.

=== EM-motive ===
Daimler AG and Bosch established a 50:50 joint venture (JV) to develop and manufacture electric motors in 2011. The JV, called EM-motive GmbH, manufactures traction motors for electric, fuel cell and extended-range vehicles at a facility in Hildesheim, Germany. In 2019, Bosch acquired the remaining shares and assumed full control of the company.

== Joint ventures ==
=== Static ADAS Calibration ===
In October 2020, Bosch and Mitchell International paired up to develop the MD-500, a wireless tablet that repair planners can use to link directly to OEM repair procedures from Diagnostic Trouble Codes (DTCs), automatically upload pre-scan and post-scans, and write estimates and calibration reports. Bosch and Mitchell launched the MD-TS21, a target system that permits repair facilities to quickly and accurately calibrate blind-spot monitors, front-facing camera, and radar sensors in automobile models with ADAS, in February 2021.

== Previous joint ventures ==
=== SB LiMotive ===
In June 2008, Bosch formed SB LiMotive, a 50:50 joint company with Samsung SDI. The company held a ceremony for a 28.000 m^{2} lithium-ion battery cell manufacturing plant in September 2009 and was scheduled to start production for hybrid vehicles in 2011 and for electric vehicles in 2012. It was estimated that the plant would generate 1,000 jobs in Ulsan, Korea in addition to the 500 employees in Korea, Germany, and the United States. SB LiMotive was officially ended in September 2012 with both companies focusing on automotive batteries alone.

=== Purolator filters ===
Bosch co-owned Purolator Filters in a joint venture with the Mann+Hummel Group until 2013. In 2013 Mann+Hummel acquired Bosch's stake.

== Corporate affairs ==
Robert Bosch GmbH is 94% owned by the Robert Bosch Stiftung, a charitable foundation. While most of the profits are invested into the corporation to build for the future and sustain growth, nearly all of the profits distributed to shareholders are devoted to humanitarian causes.

Bosch family 5% ownership 7% of total votes	Robert Bosch Stiftung; GmbH; 94% ownership no voting rights	Robert Bosch; Industrietreuhand KG; 0.01% ownership 93% of total votes
	Robert Bosch GmbH; Capital funds: €1.2 billion

The Robert Bosch Stiftung (Robert Bosch Foundation) owns 94% of the shares of Robert Bosch GmbH, but no voting rights. The Robert Bosch Industrietreuhand KG (Robert Bosch Industrial Trust KG), with old members of the company management, agents of the Bosch family, and other eminent people from the industry (such as Jürgen Hambrecht, CEO of BASF), have 93% of the votes, but no shares (0.01%). The remaining 5% of shares and 7% of voting rights are held by the descendants of the company founder Robert Bosch. Bosch invests 9% of its revenue on research and development, nearly double the industry average of 4.7%.

=== Finances ===
Year	Revenue (in million €)	Profit after tax (in million €)	Number of Employees
1973	3,303	56.8	113,023
1974	3,618	46.0	115,171
1975	3.723	70.0	105.553
1976	4,253	114.5	105,827
1977	4,683	122.7	110,459
1978	4,918	114.5	117,754
1979	5,524	87.9	120,487
1980	6,038	90.0	121,384
1981	6,621	92.5	112,869
1982	7,062	92.5	112,154
1983	8,245	124	127,992
1984	9,394	228	131,882
1985	10,851	206	140,374
1986	11,105	220	147,378
1987	12,969	422	161,343
1988	14,150	283	165,732
1989	15,639	320	174,742
1990	16,271	286	179,636
1991	17,179	276	181,498
1992	17,605	262	177,183
1993	16,601	218	164,506
1994	17,628	262	156,464
1995	18,327	281	158,372
1996	21,038	256	172,359
1997	23,955	848	179,719
1998	25,735	435	188,017
1999	27,906	460	194,000
2000	31,556	1,380	197,000
2001	34,029	650	218,000
2002	34,977	650	226,000
2003	36,357	1,100	229,000
2004	38,954	1,870	234,000
2005	41,461	2,450	249,000
2006	43,684	2,170	258,000
2007	46,320	2,850	268,000
2008	45,127	372	283,000
2009	38,174	-1,214	275,000
2010	47,259	2,489	276,000
2011	51,494	1,820	295,000
2012	44,703	2,304	273,000
2013	46,068	1,251	280,000
2014	48,951	2,637	286,000
2015	70,607	3,537	369,000
2016	73,129	2,374	384,000
2017	78,066	3,294	403,000
2018	78,465	3,574	407,000
2019	77,721	2,060	408,000
2020	71,494	749	395,000
2021	78,748	2,499	400,000
2022	88,210	1,838	421,000
2023	91,596	2,640	429,416
2024	90,345	1,332	417,859

== See also ==
- Continental AG
- Knorr-Bremse
- Siemens
