= Homemaking =

Overseeing the operations of a house or estate

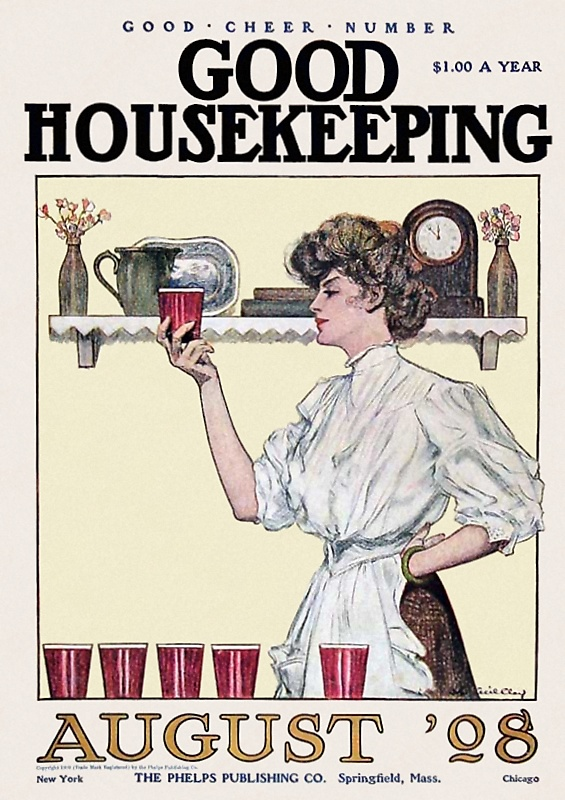
Good Housekeeping is one of several magazines related to homemaking.

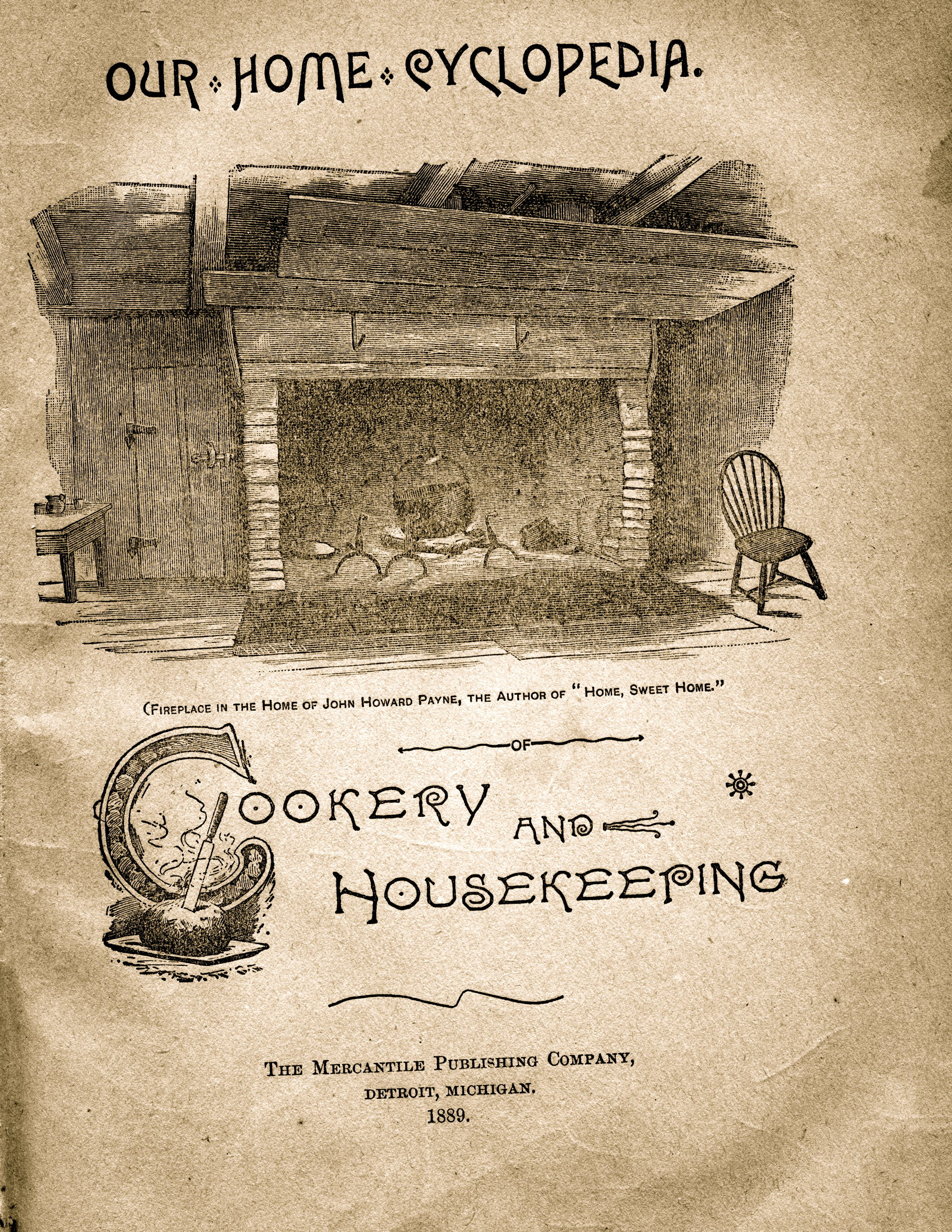
Title page of Our Home Cyclopedia: Cookery and Housekeeping, published in Detroit, Michigan, in 1889

Homemaking is mainly an American and Canadian term for the management of a home, otherwise known as housework, housekeeping, housewifery, home economics or household management. It is the act of overseeing the organizational, day-to-day operations of a house or estate, and the managing of other domestic concerns. A person in charge of the homemaking, who is not employed outside the home, in the US and Canada, is called a homemaker, a term for a housewife (or househusband), or a stay-at-home dad or stay-at-home mom.

Historically, the role of homemaker was often assumed by women. However, homemaking can be the full-time responsibility of one spouse, partner, or parent, shared with children or extended family, or shared or traded between spouses/partners as one or both work outside the home. It can also be outsourced partially or completely to paid help (like a house cleaner). The term "homemaker", may also refer to a social worker who manages a household during the incapacity of the housewife or househusband. Home health workers assume the role of homemakers when caring for elderly individuals. This includes preparing meals, giving baths, and any duties the person in need cannot perform for themselves.

== History ==
Historically, one person in a spousal arrangement serving as the sole homemaker was rare. Women almost always worked alongside their husbands in the fields or assisting them with their trade. Aristocratic women typically had servants or slaves to do most of the manual labor.

=== Ancient Greece ===
Athens was one of the few societies in history prior to the nineteenth century that idealized the role of wives as dependent homemakers rather than as work mates for their husbands.

Partly in an effort to curb the influence of powerful families, Athenian reformers in during and after the sixth century BCE cut wives off not just from their parents, but the larger world. Women were expected to focus all their attention on taking care of the house and bearing children. In wealthier families, this was taken to an extreme—women were not allowed out of their homes and inner courtyards. This also became a sign of wealth, indicating that a family had enough money that their women did not need to lift a finger. In other cases, aristocratic women were allowed out in the company of male relatives. However, lower-class women continued to work as laundresses, seamstresses, bakers, and innkeepers.

=== 19th century ===
In North America, early 19th-century ideals required homemaking be the responsibility of the woman; "the wife is properly supposed to be the light and centre of the home." Traditional wives who stayed home and did not work for pay were required by social ideals to create and maintain a peaceful space to provide to her husband and children. For women in a pre-modern environment, "it is the duty and privilege and solemn responsibility, which make this art of home-making more interesting and important to her than any other art in the world." Author of these statements, Annie Swan was not alone in the late 1800s viewpoint that women were encouraged, if not required, to maintain the home solely themselves. In 1875, Harper's Bazaar published an article outlining the duties of a housewife and the esteemed respect those duties deserve: "but if one only staid to think how countless and how onerous those duties really are, more respect would be paid to the faithful effort to perform them, and an added reverence extended to the mother who is also the housekeeper." Harper's Bazaar recognizes that women do the majority of the work within the home, pointing out that the work is detailed and at many times, difficult.

=== 20th century ===
The 20th century began with similar homemaking roles as the 19th; however, the century concluded with a much different perception. In the late 1990s, marriage consisted in most cases of both wife and husband participating in homemaking. Darlene Piña and Vern Bengtson who are anthropologists and professors at the University of Southern California, extensively researched marriage dynamics and household labor in the late twentieth century. They concluded that "all wives benefit equally by their husbands' greater involvement in household labor." The division of labor within the home promotes a healthy relationship between husband and wife. Concluding, that likelihood of increased happiness within marriage is vastly improved when homemaking is shared with the husband. West and Zimmerman, concluded an analysis of over 487 couples and found that "women were rewarded for performing feminine behaviors, such as housework, whereas men receive positive reinforcement for engaging in masculine tasks, such as breadwinning."

In contrast, a study performed by Hochschild in 1989, concluded that even when wives contributed more than 50% of the household income they often still performed more household labor than their husbands. Hochschild's study directly debunked the previous theory that women performed housework because they contributed significantly less to household income. Instead, the results of the study indicated that even in marriage dynamics where women contributed more than half of the household income, they still completed the vast majority of homemaking tasks.

Married women who are economically and emotionally dependent on their husbands are less likely to report the division of household labor as unfair. This significant group of married women felt that household labor reinforced their female gender identity and connection to femininity.

=== 21st century ===
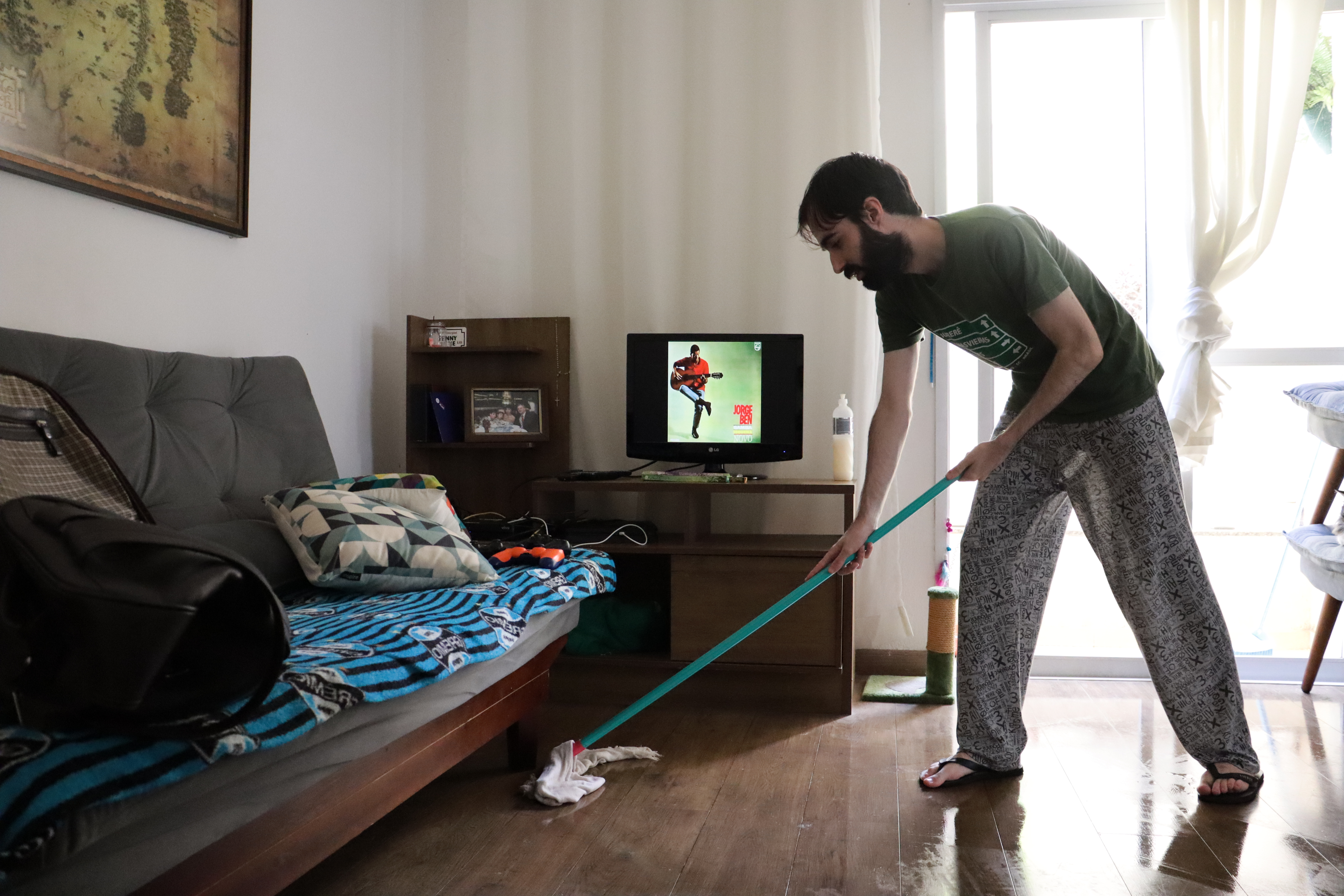
A man mopping

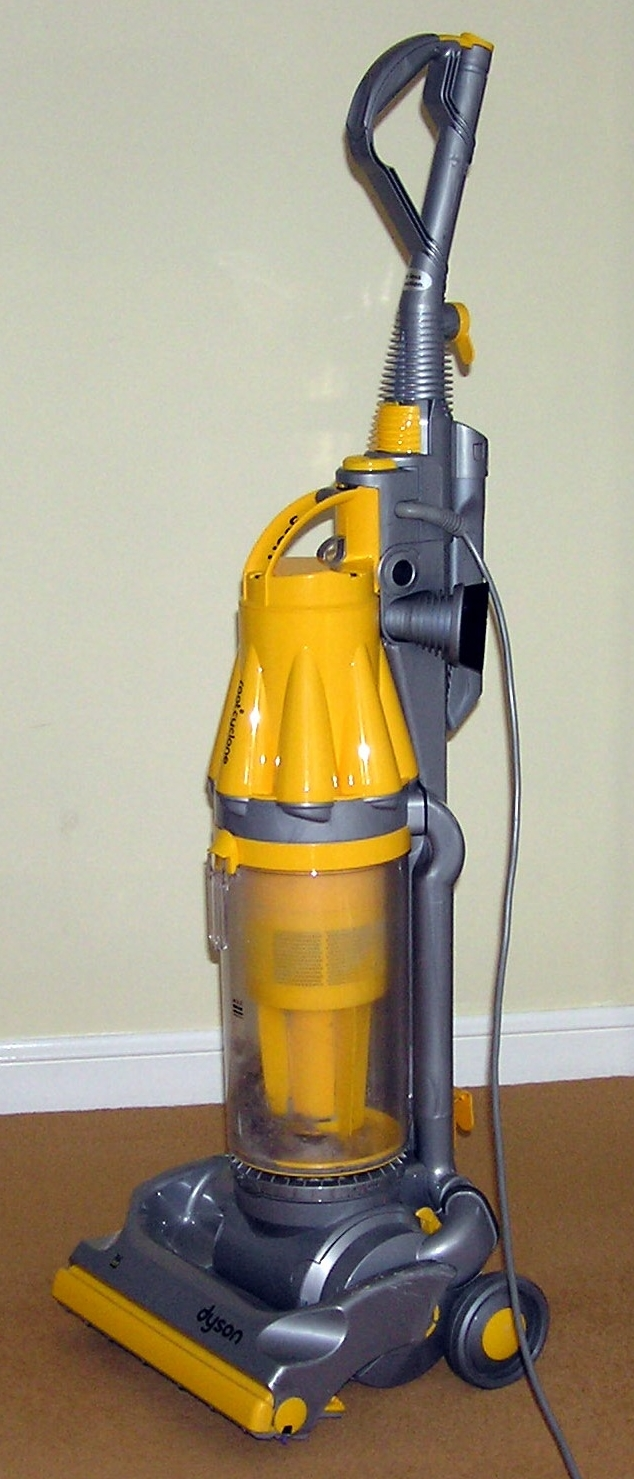
A vacuum cleaner

Sex and gender continue to shape the division of household responsibilities in the United States in the twenty-first century. According to the 2018 American Time Use Survey, 84 percent of women and 69 percent of men reported that they spent some time performing household duties, which included "housework, cooking, lawn care, or household management." Women reported spending an average of 2.6 hours a day on household activities, and men 2.0 hours. On a surveyed day, 49% percent of women and 20% of men reported doing housework.

Men and women's perception of household responsibilities differ. Pew Research Center's 2014 Religious Landscape Study found that fathers were more likely than mothers to say that chores were evenly split between both partners (56% vs. 46%). When asked, 50% of mothers reported they handled more responsibilities around the house than their partners; only 12% of fathers reported they did more household tasks. Despite this difference in perception, a majority of married U.S. adults (56%) said that sharing household chores as "very important" to a successful marriage.

In a 2008 article, social scientists Susan L. Brown and Sayaka Kawamura reported that the unequal distribution in housework was attributed mainly to time availability. They concluded: "wives typically work fewer hours than their husbands, [so] they have more time available to perform household tasks."

== Housekeeping ==
Housekeeping by the homemaker is the care and control of property, ensuring its maintenance, proper use and appearance. In a private home a maid or housekeeper is sometimes employed to do some of the housekeeping. Housework is work done by the act of housekeeping. Some housekeeping is housecleaning and some housekeeping is home chores. Home chores are housework that needs to be done at regular intervals. Housekeeping includes the budget and control of expenditures, preparing meals and buying food, paying the heat bill, and cleaning the house.

=== Cooking ===
Most modern-day houses contain sanitary facilities and a means of preparing food. A kitchen is a room or part of a room used by the homemaker for cooking, food preparation and food preservation. In the West, a modern kitchen is typically equipped with a stove, an oven, a sink with hot and cold running water, a refrigerator and kitchen cabinets. Many homemakers use a microwave oven, a dishwasher and other electric appliances like blender and convection cooker and automatic appliances like rice cookers. The main function of a kitchen is cooking or preparing food but it may also be used for dining for a casual meal such as lunch.

Cooking is the process of preparing food, making, selecting, measuring and combining ingredients in an ordered procedure for producing safe and edible food. The process encompasses a vast range of methods, tools and combinations of ingredients to alter the flavor, appearance, texture, or digestibility of food. Factors affecting the outcome include the variability of ingredients, ambient conditions, tools, and the skill of the individual doing the actual cooking.

The diversity of cooking worldwide is a reflection of the aesthetic, agricultural, economic, cultural, social and religious diversity of people across the globe. Applying heat to a food usually, though not always, chemically transforms it, thus changing its flavor, texture, consistency, appearance, and nutritional properties. Methods of cooking that involve the boiling of liquid in a receptacle have been practised at least since the 10th millennium BC, with the introduction of pottery.

=== Cleaning ===
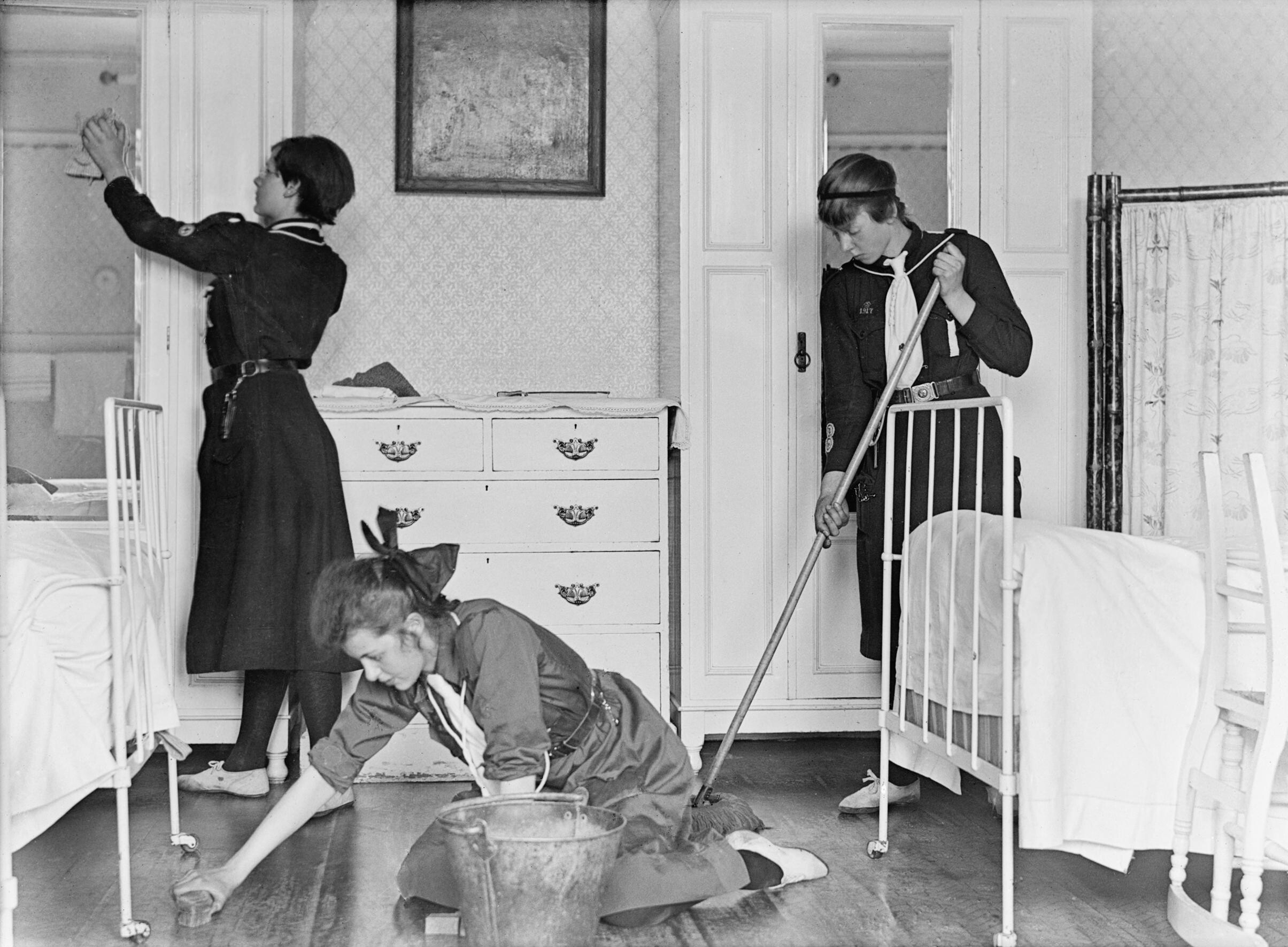
Girl guides cleaning a room, 1917

House cleaning by the homemaker is the systematic process of making a home neat and clean. This may be applied more broadly than just an individual home, such as a metaphor for a similar "clean up" process applied elsewhere such as at a hotel or as a procedural reform. In the process of house cleaning general cleaning activities are completed, such as disposing of rubbish, storing of belongings in regular places, cleaning dirty surfaces, dusting and vacuuming. The details of this are various and complicated enough that many books have been published on the subject. How-to sites on the internet have many articles on house cleaning. Tools include the vacuum cleaner, broom and mop. Supplies such as cleaning solutions and sponges are sold in grocery stores and elsewhere. Professional cleaners can be hired for less frequent or specialist tasks such as cleaning blinds, rugs, and sofas. Professional services are also offered for the basic tasks. Safety is a consideration because some cleaning products are toxic and some cleaning tasks are physically demanding. Green cleaning refers to cleaning without causing pollution or chemicals that may cause bodily harm. The history of house cleaning has links to the advancement of technology.

Outdoor housecleaning chores include removing leaves from rain gutters, washing windows, sweeping doormats, cleaning the pool, putting away lawn furniture, and taking out the trash.

=== Laundry ===
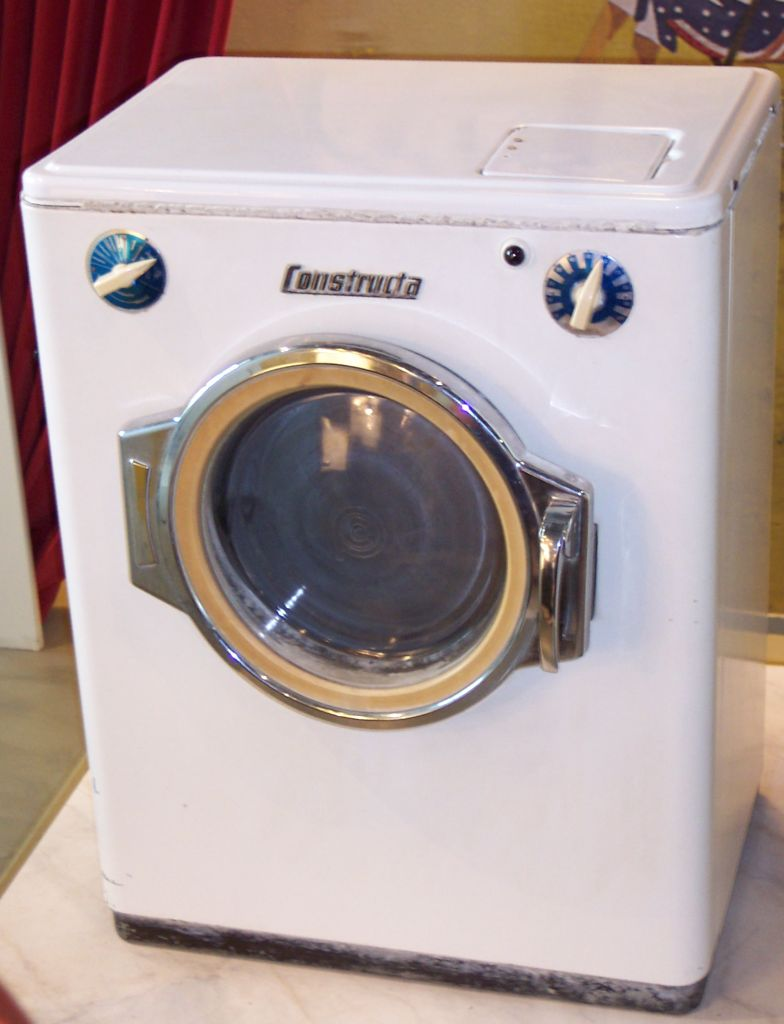
A 1950s washing machine from Constructa

Laundry refers to the act of washing clothing and linens, the place where that washing is done, and/or that which needs to be, is being, or has been laundered. Various chemicals may be used to increase the solvent power of water, such as the compounds in soaproot or yucca-root used by Native American tribes. Soap, a compound made from lye (from wood-ash) and fat, is an ancient and very common laundry aid. Modern washing machines typically use powdered or liquid laundry detergent in place of more traditional soap. Once clean, the clothes are dried.

Washing machines and dryers are now fixtures in homes around the world. In some parts of the world, including the US, Canada, and Switzerland, apartment buildings and dormitories often have laundry rooms, where residents share washing machines and dryers. Usually the machines are set to run only when money is put in a coin slot. In other parts of the world, apartment buildings with laundry rooms are uncommon, and each apartment may have its own washing machine. Those without a machine at home or the use of a laundry room must either wash their clothes by hand or visit a commercial laundromat.

A clothes dryer is a household appliance that is used to remove moisture from a load of clothing and other textiles, generally shortly after they are cleaned in a washing machine. Most dryers consist of a rotating drum called a tumbler through which heated air is circulated to evaporate the moisture from the load. The tumbler is rotated relatively slowly in order to maintain space between the articles in the load. In most cases, the tumbler is belt-driven by an induction motor. Using these machines may cause clothes to shrink, become less soft (due to loss of short soft fibers/ lint) and fade. For these reasons, as well as environmental concerns, many people use open air methods such as a clothes line and clotheshorse.

Laundry starch is used in the laundering of clothes. Starch was widely used in Europe in the 16th and 17th centuries to stiffen the wide collars and ruffs of fine linen which surrounded the necks of the well-to-do. During the 19th century and early 20th century, it was stylish to stiffen the collars and sleeves of men's shirts and the ruffles of girls' petticoats by applying starch to them as the clean clothes were being ironed. Aside from the smooth, crisp edges it gave to clothing, it served practical purposes as well. Dirt and sweat from a person's neck and wrists would stick to the starch rather than to the fibers of the clothing, and would easily wash away along with the starch. After each laundering, the starch would be reapplied. Today the product is sold in aerosol cans for home use. Kitchen starch used as a thickening agent for food can also be applied to laundered fabrics (requires boiling).

== Maintenance ==
Homemakers that follow predictive maintenance techniques determine the condition of in-service equipment in order to predict when maintenance should be performed. This approach offers cost savings over routine or time-based maintenance, because tasks are performed only when warranted. Homemakers that follow preventive maintenance methods ensure that household equipment and the house are in satisfactory operating condition by providing for inspection, detection, and correction of incipient failures either before they occur or before they develop into major defects.

=== Home maintenance ===
Home maintenance involves the diagnosis and resolution of problems in a home, and is related to home maintenance to avoid such problems. Many types of maintenance are "Do it yourself" (DIY) projects. Maintenance is not necessarily the same as home improvement, although many improvements can result from repairs or maintenance. Often the costs of larger repairs will justify the alternative of investment in full-scale improvements. It may make just as much sense to upgrade a home system (with an improved one) as to repair it or incur ever-more-frequent and expensive maintenance for an inefficient, obsolete or dying system. For a DIY project, also useful is the established limits on time and money investments before a repair (or list of repairs) become overwhelming and discouraging, and less likely to ever be completed.

=== Lawn maintenance ===
Homemakers who have a lawn responsibility adhere to seasonal lawn care practices, which vary to some extent depending on the climate zone and type of grass that is grown (whether cool season or warm season varieties). Various recognized method used by homemakers in lawn care are observed in any area. In spring or early summer, homemakers seed, sod, or sprig a yard when the ground is warmer. In summer lawn mowers are used at high cutting for cool season grass, and lower cutting for warm season lawns. In autumn, lawns are mown by homemakers at a lower height and thatch build-up that occurs in warm season grasses are removed. Homemakers do add sandy loam and apply fertilizer, containing some type of wetting agent. Cool season lawns are planted in the autumn with adequate rainfall. Lawn care in the winter is minimal, requiring only light feedings of organic material, such as green-waste compost, and minerals to encourage earthworms and beneficial microbes.

== Management ==
Household management by the homemaker is the act of overseeing the organizational, financial, and day-to-day operations of a house or estate. It differs from housekeeping, which consists of the physical maintenance and cleaning of a house.

=== House organization ===
House organization or home organization includes interior design to make the home aesthetically pleasing by arranging furniture, plants, blinds, and so forth. De-cluttering means removing unnecessary things from the house.

==== De-cluttering ====
Household de-cluttering involves putting things in their proper place after they have been used. "Cleaning up your mess" might involve removing glasses, eating utensils or gadgets i.e. toys from the living room if you have eaten a meal there in front of the television. If several people have done that over a few days and not removed their glasses, dishes and utensils from the living room, the living room is considered to be "cluttered" with dishes. The dishes are out of place because they belong in the kitchen, washed and put away in the cupboards. That is the most common example of clutter in a modern North American household.

There is another definition of clutter, which refers to having simply too many things and not enough room for all of it. Sometimes as happens in Asian households, the items are necessary, but the home is simply too small, and ingenious methods are needed to organize everything to minimize unsightly clutter. Removing unneeded or no longer necessary objects from a household or home is also an aspect of de-cluttering. Objects can be given away to friends or charitable organizations, sold as second-hand, recycled or thrown away.

Extreme forms of an inability to de-clutter is a behavioral aspect of compulsive hoarding. On the other end, a society that relies overly much on generating and then disposing of waste is referred to as a throw-away society.

=== Household purchasing ===
Household purchasing refers to a homemaker's efforts to acquire goods or services to accomplish the goals of the household. Though there are several households that attempt to set standards in the purchasing process, processes can vary greatly between households. Typically the word "purchasing" is not used interchangeably with the word "procurement", since procurement typically includes other concepts. Homemakers decide the market goods that the household will buy, such as the groceries which have been bought at a grocer's or supermarket.

Another important purchase handled by homemakers is the power source used for appliances. Home or other building heating may include boilers, furnaces, and water heaters. Compressed natural gas is used in rural homes without connections to piped-in public utility services, or with portable grills. However, due to being less economical than LPG, LPG (Propane) is the dominant source of rural gas for natural gas-powered ranges and/or ovens, natural gas-heated clothes dryers, heating/cooling and central heating. The amount of usages is determined by factors such as natural gas prices.

=== Servants ===
Homemakers may manage household workers or "domestic workers".

== Work strategies ==
In sociology, household work strategy is the division of labour between members of a household, whether implicit or the result of explicit decision–making, with the alternatives weighed up in a simplified type of cost-benefit analysis. It is a plan for the relative deployment of household members' time between the three domains of employment:

1. in the market economy, including home-based self-employment second jobs, in order to obtain money to buy goods and services in the market
2. domestic production work, such as cultivating a vegetable patch or raising chickens, purely to supply food to the household
3. domestic consumption work to provide goods and services directly within the household, such as cooking meals, child–care, household repairs, or the manufacture of clothes and gifts

Household work strategies may vary over the life-cycle, as household members age, or with the economic environment; they may be imposed by one person or be decided collectively.

== Household production ==
"Household production" is an economic category for activities including homemaking. It is defined as "the production of the goods and services by the members of a household, for their own consumption, using their own capital and their own unpaid labor. Goods and services produced by households for their own use include accommodation, meals, clean clothes, and child care. The process of household production involves the transformation of purchased intermediate commodities into final consumption commodities. Households use their own capital and their own labor."

There are efforts to construct estimates of the value of household production in a way analogous to GDP, though the category is not usually included in GDP. Goods and services created by households are generally consumed within the same country, and hence contribute in a "Domestic Consumption" category in national accounts.

== Wages for housework ==
The International Wages for Housework Campaign was a global, social movement co-founded in 1972 in Padua, Italy, by author and activist Selma James. The Campaign was formed to raise awareness of how housework and childcare are the base of all industrial work and to stake the claim that these unavoidable tasks should be compensated as paid, wage labor. The demands for the Wages for Housework formally called for economic compensation for domestic work but also used these demands to more generally call attention to the affective labors of women, the reliance of capitalist economies on exploitative labor practices against women, and leisure inequality.

== Effects of technology and advertising ==
Many home appliances have been invented that make housework faster or more effective compared to before the Industrial Revolution. These include:

- Dishwasher
- Microwave oven
- Refrigerator, reducing the number of grocery trips or the amount of food preservation work to do
- Sewing machine
- Small appliances such as the electric mixer, blender, toaster, and coffee maker
- Vacuum cleaner
- Washing machine and clothes dryer

Utilities can potentially eliminate work like gathering and chopping firewood, shoveling coal, fetching water from outdoors, and heating cold tap water.

Historian Ruth Schwartz Cowan estimated that homemakers in the 1800s performed about 50–60 hours of work per week, and that this is the same as the 1990s. She says that, rather than reducing the amount of time devoted to housework, labor-saving devices have been used to make the same amount of time do more work, such as by vacuuming a rug instead of sweeping it, or washing fabrics more frequently. Modern parents also more frequently transport their children to after-school activities, and doctors no longer make house calls.

== See also ==
- Handyman
- Scientific management

== Sources ==
- Arnold, E. (1993). Voices of American Homemakers. Bloomington: Indiana University Press.
- Frederick, C. (1919). Household Engineering: Scientific Management in the Home. Chicago: American school of home economics.
- Goldstein, Carolyn M. (2012). Creating Consumers: Home Economists in Twentieth-Century America. Univ of North Carolina Press. ISBN 9780807872383.
- Harvey, L. S. (1920). Food Facts for the Home-maker. Boston: Houghton Mifflin company.
- Kinne, H., & Cooley, A. M. (1914). Shelter and Clothing: A Textbook of the Household Arts. New York: Macmillan.
- Lopata, H. Z. (1994). Circles and Settings: Role Changes of American Women. SUNY Series in Gender and Society. Albany: State University of New York Press. "Homemaker" Page 137+.
- Snedden, D. (1919). Vocational Homemaking Education: Some Problems and Proposals. New York: Teachers College, Columbia University.
