= NEFF =

NEFF may refer to:

- Constructa-Neff, a German manufacturer of high-end kitchen appliances headquartered in Munich, Germany, sometimes stylized as NEFF in its logo.
- Namibian Economic Freedom Fighters, a far-left, pan-African political party in Namibia.
