= Bosch Thermotechnik =

German heating technology company

Bosch Thermotechnik GmbH
- Type: GmbH
- Industry: Heating technology
- Founded: 1911; 115 years ago
- Headquarters: Wetzlar, Germany
- Key people: Jan Brockmann (Chairman); Vítor Gregório; Birte Lübbert; Stefan Thiel; Thomas Volz
- Revenue: €4.4 billion (2024)
- Number of employees: 13,800
- Parent: Robert Bosch GmbH
- Website: www.bosch-homecomfortgroup.com

Bosch Thermotechnik GmbH, which has been operating under the name Bosch Home Comfort Group since April 1, 2023, is a supplier of heating and cooling appliances (HVAC). The company is based in Wetzlar, Germany and generated a revenue of €4.4 billion in 2024.

== Company structure ==
The Bosch Home Comfort Group is a subsidiary of Robert Bosch GmbH and operates legally as Bosch Thermotechnik GmbH.

In the 2024 financial year, the Bosch Home Comfort Group generated a revenue of €4.4 billion and employed around 13,800 people.

== History ==
=== Background ===
The company's history dates back to the acquisition of heating appliance operations from Junkers & Co. in 1932 by the former Robert Bosch AG (later Robert Bosch GmbH). In 1953, Junkers & Co. relocated to Wernau and started manufacturing gas central heating appliances and control and safety equipment for gas appliances.

In 1998, Bosch acquired the company Vulcano Termo-Domésticos (Vulcano), founded in 1977 in Aveiro, Portugal, to develop and produce technologies for water heating. In 1992, the majority shares in the British Worcester Group, founded in 1962, were purchased, which at that time was the market leader for combi boilers in the UK. The Worchester group subsidiary, Belgian heater manufacturer Radson, was also acquired. In 1996, the company took over the French heating technology company e.l.m.leblanc. With this acquisition, Bosch tried to strengthen its position in the French market for gas boilers, gas water heaters, and heating systems.

In July 2003, Bosch acquired Buderus AG, a provider of heating technology, founded in 1731. Subsequently, the heating technology activities of Buderus and Bosch were merged, and on August 2, 2004, BBT Thermotechnik was established. Through the merger, the company became the largest manufacturer of heating products in Europe.

Furthermore, the company took over the heat-pump manufacturer IVT Holding AB (IVT) in 2006, which was founded in Sweden in 1968. In 2007, BBT Thermotechnik purchased the US-manufacturer of geothermal electric heat pumps FHP Manufacturing, to gain better access to the American market in this product field.

=== Bosch Thermotechnik ===
In 2009, Bosch Thermotechnik acquired the boiler manufacturer Loos Deutschland GmbH from Gunzenhausen, along with all its foreign subsidiaries.

Due to the Paris Agreement, the demand for heat pumps as sustainable heating technologies rose, and as a result, Bosch began investing in hydrogen technologies and heat pumps.

On April 1, 2023, Bosch Thermotechnik was renamed Bosch Home Comfort Group. In the same year, the company announced an investment of €225 million for a new heat pump factory in Dobromierz, Poland and began manufacturing heat-pump components in their Portuguese production plant as well as in their plant in Eschenburg, Germany.

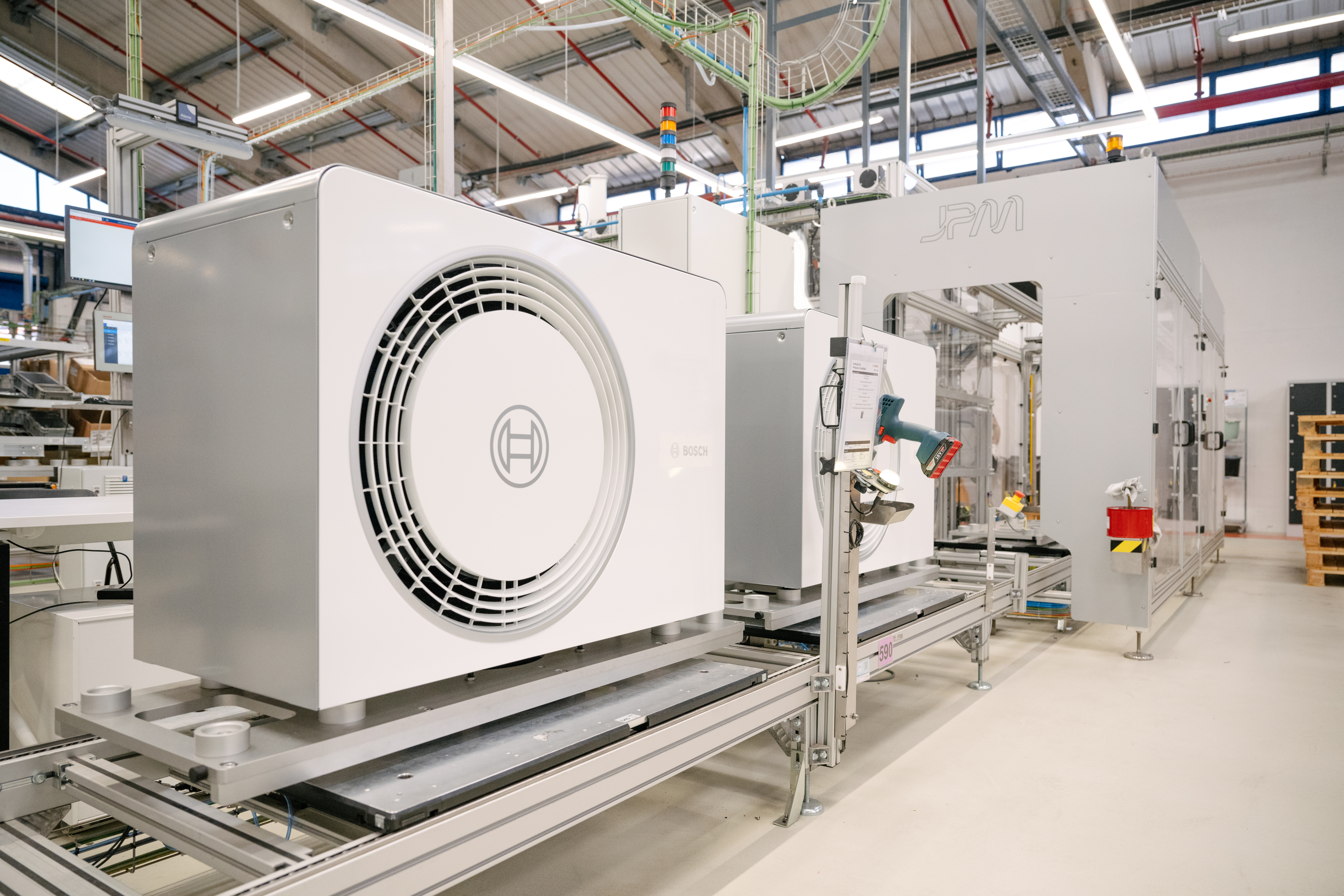
Bosch heat pump

In 2024, Bosch took over the global HVAC business for residential and light commercial buildings from Johnson Controls. Bosch intended to integrate the acquired businesses into the Bosch Home Comfort Group. According to Martin Buchenau and Timm Seckel from Handelsblatt, the shareholders of Johnson Controls were satisfied with the sale price achieved. Bosch paid double the revenue that the business units of Johnson Controls had generated up to the signing of the contracts. According to the journalists, the acquisition of the company would positively contribute to achieving Bosch's corporate return. Marek Miara from the Fraunhofer Institute in Freiburg assessed the timing of the purchase as "very favourable", as the market for heat pumps in Germany was weak at that time. According to analysts, the ongoing climate change was the main reason for the acquisition, as an increasing number of facilities such as schools and care homes require air conditioning to combat global warming.

== Products ==
The Bosch Home Comfort Group manufactures and sells products for the heating, ventilation, and air conditioning markets. Most notably, the company offers various models of heat pumps.

The company's products are sold to both private and business customers.
