= Peter Gumbsch =

German physicist and materials scientist

Peter Gumbsch (born 21 January 1962 in Pforzheim, Germany) is a German physicist and materials scientist. He is the director of the Fraunhofer-Institut für Werkstoffmechanik IWM, (Fraunhofer Institute for Mechanics of Materials IWM) in Freiburg, Germany and professor for mechanics of materials at the Karlsruhe Institute of Technology (KIT).

Gumbsch was elected a member of the National Academy of Engineering in 2016 for multi-scaled modelling techniques that improve fracture and deformation behavior of structural materials.

== Biography ==
Peter Gumbsch received his degree in physics (1988) and his doctoral degree (1991) from the University of Stuttgart. After extended visits at the Sandia National Laboratories in Livermore, California, postdoctoral work at the Imperial College, London and the University of Oxford, he returned to the Max-Planck-Institute in Stuttgart as a group leader and established the group “Modeling and Simulation of Thin Film Phenomena”.

In 2001, he took over the professorship for Materials Mechanics at the University of Karlsruhe, now the Karlsruhe Institute of Technology (KIT). There, he heads departments at the Institute for Applied Materials IAM-ZM and the Institute for Nanotechnology INT. He also heads the Fraunhofer Institute for Mechanics of Materials IWM . In 2015, Gumbsch was appointed to the German Science Council and was chairman of its Scientific Commission from 2017 to 2021. From 2016 to 2020, he was an elected member of the Fraunhofer Senate and, from 2019 to 2025, a member of the Presidium of the Fraunhofer Society as a member of the Executive Board of the Fraunhofer Group MATERIALS.

== Research ==
The German materials scientist Peter Gumbsch conducts research in the field mechanics of materials, focusing on questions relating to the behavior of materials under load. His work centers on understanding materials, components, and systems at the limits of their load-bearing capacity. His goal is to make materials and components safer, more reliable, more durable, and to improve material and energy efficiency of technical systems. Peter Gumbsch investigates the structure and properties of materials from their atomic structure to their macroscopic behavior. His research is aimed at understanding the behavior of materials, capturing it digitally and modeling it mathematically. In addition to deformation, fatigue, and fracture processes, he is particularly interested in friction and wear. His concepts of multiscale material modeling combine nano- and microstructural processes inside the material with its macroscopic behavior. Peter Gumbsch and his team are doing pioneering work in linking material data, material modeling, and product development.

== Awards and honors ==
- 2019 Member of the National Academy of Science and Engineering acatech
- since 2016 Visiting Distinguished Professor, University of California, Santa Barbara UCSB.
- 2016 Member of the US National Academy of Engineering (NAE), USA
- 2013 DGM Prize, German Society for Material Science
- 2009 Hector Science Award
- 2008 Member of the German Academy of Sciences Leopoldina – National Academy of Science, Germany
- 2007 Gottfried Wilhelm Leibniz Prize, German Research Foundation
- 1998 FEMS Lecturer, Federation of European Materials Societies
- 1998 Masing Memorial Prize, German Society for Material Science
- 1997 Peter Haasen Prize, Institute of Metal Physics, Universität Göttingen in association with the Peter Haasen Foundation
- 1992 Otto Hahn Medal, Max Planck Society
