= BSH Hausgeräte =

German manufacturer of home appliances

BSH Hausgeräte GmbH
- Formerly: Bosch-Siemens Hausgeräte GmbH (1967–2015)
- Type: Subsidiary
- Industry: Manufacturing
- Founded: May 1967; 59 years ago
- Founders: Robert Bosch GmbH; Siemens AG
- Headquarters: Munich, Germany
- Area served: Worldwide
- Key people: Rudolf Klötscher (CEO)
- Products: Home appliances
- Revenue: €15 billion (2025)
- Number of employees: 56,000 (2026)
- Parent: Bosch
- Website: bsh-group.com

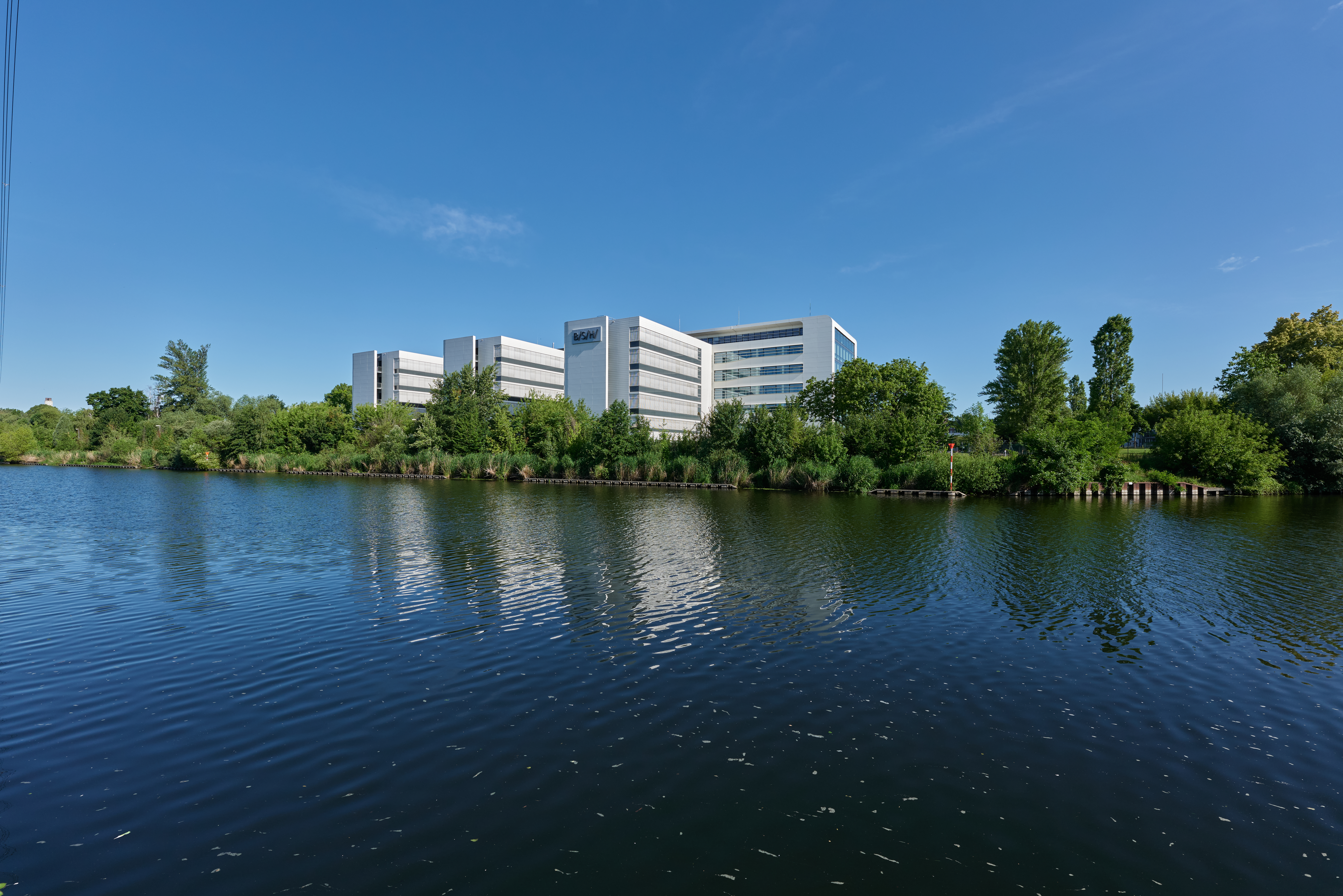
BSH Hausgeräte GmbH

BSH Hausgeräte GmbH (Note: German pronunciation: [beːʔɛsˈhaː ˈhaʊsɡəʁɛːtə ɡeːʔɛmbeːˈhaː]) (German for 'BSH Home Appliances Company'; stylized as B/S/H/) is a manufacturer of home appliances in Europe. The group stemmed from a joint venture set up in May 1967 between Robert Bosch GmbH (Stuttgart) and Siemens AG (Munich), and the company achieved annual sales of 15 billion euros in the year 2025. BSH is an acronym for Bosch und Siemens Hausgeräte. (Note: German pronunciation: [ˈbɔʃ ʔʊnt ˈziːmɛns ˈhaʊsɡəʁɛːtə]) In September 2014, Robert Bosch GmbH agreed to purchase Siemens' 50% stake in the joint venture for 3 billion euros.

BSH is a global company with a presence in 50 countries. As of 2026, the company had 37 factories and a total workforce of about 56,000 people. The BSH product range includes large home appliances for cooking, dishwashing, laundry (washing, drying and folding), refrigeration and freezing, as well as a multitude of small household appliances.

== History ==
BSH Hausgeräte GmbH (formerly Bosch-Siemens Hausgeräte GmbH – BSHG) was founded in 1967 as a joint venture between Bosch and Siemens and started out with three factories, that were all located in West Germany. In 1976, BSH acquired Pitsos in Athens, Greece (BSH Ikiakes Syskeveses A.B.E.). In the 1980s, recession and competition led to some companies in the industry merging, acquisitions and some going out of business. In 1982, BSH acquired the Neff premium brand, who were founded in Baden-Württemberg, from AEG and established Neff GmbH.

BSH developed new technologies and products, such as AquaStop for washing machines and dishwashers, which was patented in 1982 and introduced in 1985, a 90 cm wide oven in 1986 and a 45 cm wide dishwasher in 1987. In Spain in the years 1988/89, BSH acquired Balay in Zaragoza and purchased Safel in Pamplona.

In 1993, BSH stopped using CFCs in refrigerator insulation. BSH made efforts to reduce the environmental impact of their products and became the first company to stop using HFCs in the majority of their refrigerators in 1994. The Montreal agreement banned companies using CFCs, from the end of 1995, with the chemical industry encouraging the use of HFCs as an alternative.

During the 1990s BSH expanded further, they acquired Gaggenau, they invested to take a controlling stake in Brazilian home appliance manufacturer Continental 2001 S.A. which provided them with six factories in Brazil and Mexico, they expanded into China via a joint venture with Wuxi Little Swan Group creating BSW Household Appliances Co., they obtained a majority interest in PEG Profilo Elektrikli Gereçler Sanayii A.Ş. in Istanbul, thus adding another production site to its portfolio in Çerkezköy, Turkey, and opened another factory in Nauen, Germany. They also agreed a further joint venture in China, which developed a factory in Chuzhou, and took a majority interest in the home appliance manufacturer Coldex, S.A. based in Lima, Peru. BSH also began to expand in the US, opening a factory in North Carolina and acquiring the California based Thermador Corporation.

In October 2000, BSH agreed a joint venture with Hitachi, with BSH taking a 60% stake and Hitachi having the remaining 40% stake, to create home appliances for the South-East Asian market. BSH also expanded further in the US by extending production facilities in 2003, for the Bosch range. In the same year, BSH moved to a new group headquarters building in Munich, Germany. The company also continued to grow in China, building manufacturing facilities in Nanjing in 2004 and an appliance park in the region, with factories, in 2005.

BSH Home Appliances Saudi Arabia LLC was founded in Jeddah, Saudi Arabia in 2010, as a joint venture. In 2011, the newly constructed BSH Technology Center, with research and office facilities, was opened in Berlin, Germany. In November 2012, BSH announced its intention to acquire the Polish home appliance manufacturer Zelmer. The transaction was completed in 2013.

In 2014, BSH began to produce washing machines at its factory in Chennai, India. Four years previously, the company had established a wholly owned subsidiary and offices in the country, prior to launching washing machines in 2011. Other products such as refrigerators and dishwashers were also launched. Prior to 2010, the company's products were sold via a distributor.

On September 22, 2014, Siemens and Bosch announced that Siemens would be selling all its shares in their joint enterprise to Bosch, pending the approval of the antitrust authorities. The sale was completed on January 5, 2015, after receiving competition authority approval, and from that point on the company was fully owned by Bosch. As part of the acquisition, the company's name was changed to BSH Hausgeräte GmbH.

In 2020, BSH sold the rights to its Zelmer brand to the Spanish group B&B Trends. It was reported in 2021, that Pyramis had acquired the Pitsos factory in Athens from BSH. BSH business activities in Russia were impacted by the Russo-Ukrainian war and sanctions. In 2023 they sought to sell their St. Petersburg factory, but the plant was taken over by way of a presidential decree in 2024, and is now being run by a subsidiary of Gazprom.

The business has opened showrooms that provide an immersive experience, in the US and Canada, where customers can also view and try products. The Houston showroom opened in 2024 and another opened in Beverly Hills, in 2025.

In 2025, BSH announced that they were building a new factory for small appliances in Rzeszów, Poland. The company have developed a significant presence in the country, over three decades, that includes multiple manufacturing sites, logistics and research and development facilities. In the same year, they announced that they would be closing two manufacturing plants in Germany, over the following couple of years. BSH Home Appliances Pvt. Ltd, which is the company's Indian subsidiary, has developed a large retail presence in the country, with 134 stores, as of 2026.

== Brands ==
=== Global ===
- Bosch
- Siemens
- Gaggenau

=== Regional ===
- Neff
- Thermador

=== Local ===
- Balay
- Constructa
- Pitsos
- Profilo

== Notable innovations ==
- 1985: BSH starts using AquaStop technology in washing machines, which prevents water damage from burst or detached hoses or hose leaks.
- 2002: BSH founds its first fully retractable patented SLIDE & HIDE oven door which creates space for convenient access to the inside of the oven.
- 2006: BSH introduces dishwashers with VarioSpeed technology which reduces running time for the same full performance.
- 2008: BSH presents the first dishwasher with zeolite drying system which reduces the energy consumption of dishwashers by 20 percent. The innovation has received awards for accelerating sustainable development. It was awarded the "Innovation Prize for Climate and Environment" from Dr. Norbert Röttgen, German Federal Minister for the Environment, for promoting energy-efficiency products.
- 2010: BSH introduces the world's first washing machine with integrated dosing system i-DOS allowing accurate dosing of detergent. The system reduces water consumption.
- 2011: BSH launches its first full-surface induction with TFT touch display. The single large cooking surface with full-surface induction allows for pots and pans to be placed anywhere.
- 2021: The first ever portable fabric refresher FreshUp from BSH is launched that removes odours with plasma technology.
