= Constructa-Neff =

German kitchen appliances manufacturer

Constructa-Neff Vertriebs-GmbH
- Company type: GmbH
- Industry: Kitchen appliances
- Founded: Bretten, Germany (12 June 1877)
- Founder: Carl Andreas Neff
- Headquarters: Munich, Germany
- Key people: Stefan Kinkel; Volker Klodwig
- Products: Cookers; Fridges; Freezers; Hobs; Dishwashers
- Number of employees: 1,300 (Germany)
- Parent: BSH Hausgeräte
- Website: neff-home.com

Constructa-Neff Vertriebs-GmbH (formerly Neff GmbH, stylized as NEFF in its logo) is a German manufacturer of high-end kitchen appliances headquartered in Munich, Germany. The company was founded by Carl Andreas Neff in 1877 and has been a wholly owned subsidiary of BSH Hausgeräte GmbH since 1982.

== History ==
=== Formation ===
It was founded as a small family company in Bretten, Baden-Württemberg, Germany, on 12 June 1877 by Carl Andreas Neff. It was first known as Carl Neff Herd und Ofenfabrik (stove and oven factory). In 1914 the company first made a gas oven. In 1950, they introduced their first oven with a thermostat. By 1955, they were making appliances in different colours, to suit a bespoke fitted kitchen. The company had the slogan im Haus - der Zeit voraus (in the house - ahead of time).

=== Innovations ===
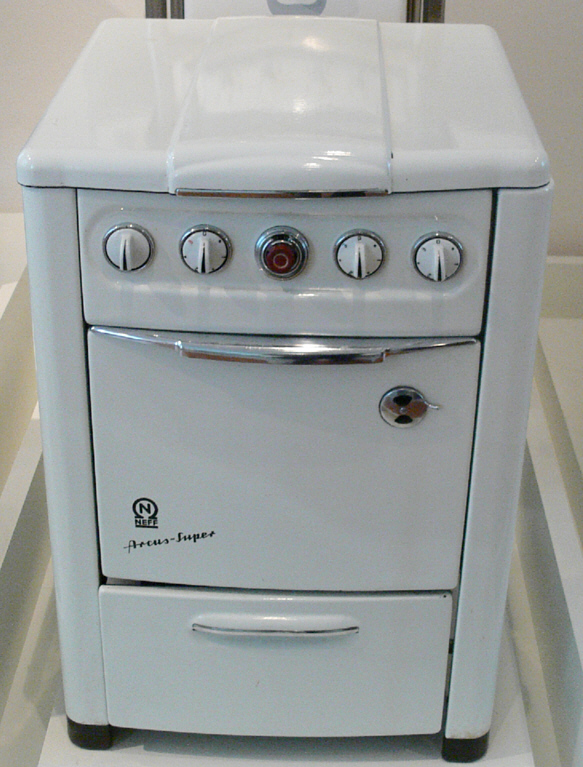
1957 cooker "Arcus super"

In 1957, it introduced the first microwave oven. In 1957, it introduced the first induction cooker (hob) in Europe, marketing it under the revolutionary slogan of Kochen auf der kalten Platte (cook on a cold surface). In 1961 it introduced the first integrated cooker units in Europe, built into other kitchen units - the built-in oven. Also in the same year they began selling larger microwave cookers for commercial (catering) uses. By 1970 it was branching out into providing for the full range of units to make up a fitted kitchen. By the early 1970s the cookers were among the first to be controlled with a digital clock.

In 1971 it introduced its Circotherm system whereby hot air was circulated around the oven to allow a distribution of cooking with more regularity. These cookers are known as convection oven or fan ovens, and are still for a specialist market. The Circotherm system was patented by the company, marketed under the slogan Rundum-Hitze ist mehr (all around heat is more). In 1985, the convection oven system was first introduced for gas ovens.

=== AEG ===
In the late twentieth century NEFF-Werke was a subsidiary of AEG-Telefunken (Allgemeine Elektricitäts-Gesellschaft, formed in 1967). The other subsidiaries were AEG-Telefunken Hausgeräte and Zanker. The NEFF factory was in Bretten in the north-west of Baden-Württemberg, where it employed around 2,000 people. In August 1982, AEG was having financial problems. AEG was bought by Daimler-Benz in 1985, and ceased to exist in 1997.

=== Bosch and Siemens ===
In 1967, Robert Bosch GmbH of Stuttgart and Siemens AG of Munich formed a joint venture, Bosch und Siemens Hausgeräte GmbH. It bought NEFF in 1982 when AEG went bankrupt.

=== International ===
The company is owned by BSH Home Appliances Ltd, based in Germany. The UK head office is based in Wolverton, Buckinghamshire. Its 4 UK kitchen appliance brands are Bosch, Siemens, Neff and Gaggenau. Globally it is joined by other BSH brands: Thermador, Balay, Coldex, Constructa, Pitsos, Ufesa, Profilo, Zelmer, Junker, & Viva. The company was merged with Constructa into the Constructa-Neff Vertriebs-GmbH, which continues to sell the brands Constructa and Neff individually.

== Products ==
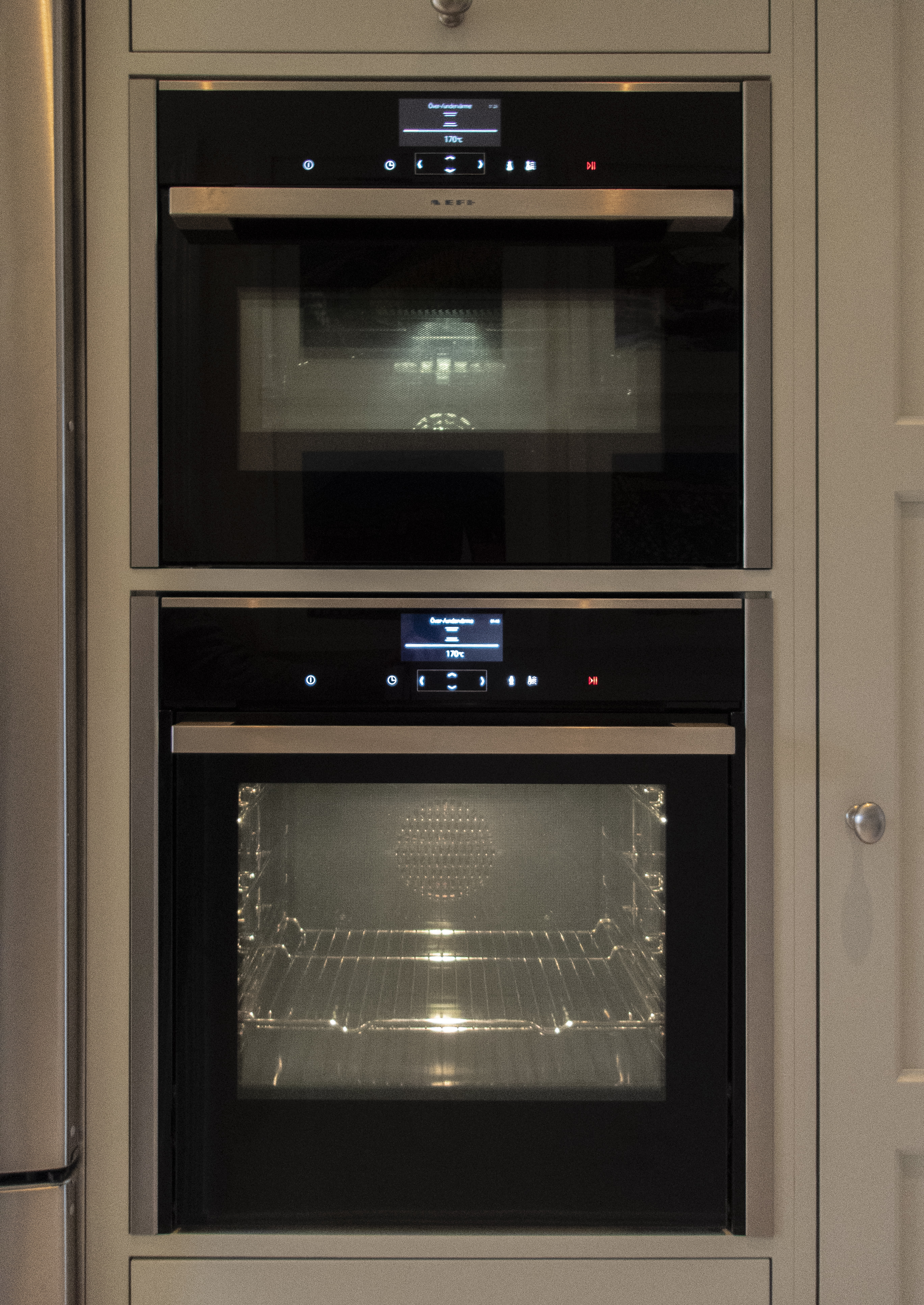
Neff integrated microwave and oven

- Conventional ovens
- Microwave ovens
- Hobs
- Dishwashers
- Fridges
- Freezers
- Washing machines
- Tumble dryers
- Coffeemakers
