= Balay =

Spanish home appliance company

BSH Electrodomésticos España, S.A
- Trade name: Balay
- Type: Sociedad Anónima
- Founded: 1947; 79 years ago
- Headquarters: Zaragoza, Spain
- Area served: Spain and Portugal
- Key people: Fernando Gil Bayon, Director General
- Products: Home appliances
- Parent: Bosch-Siemens Hausgeräte GmbH
- Website: www.balay.es

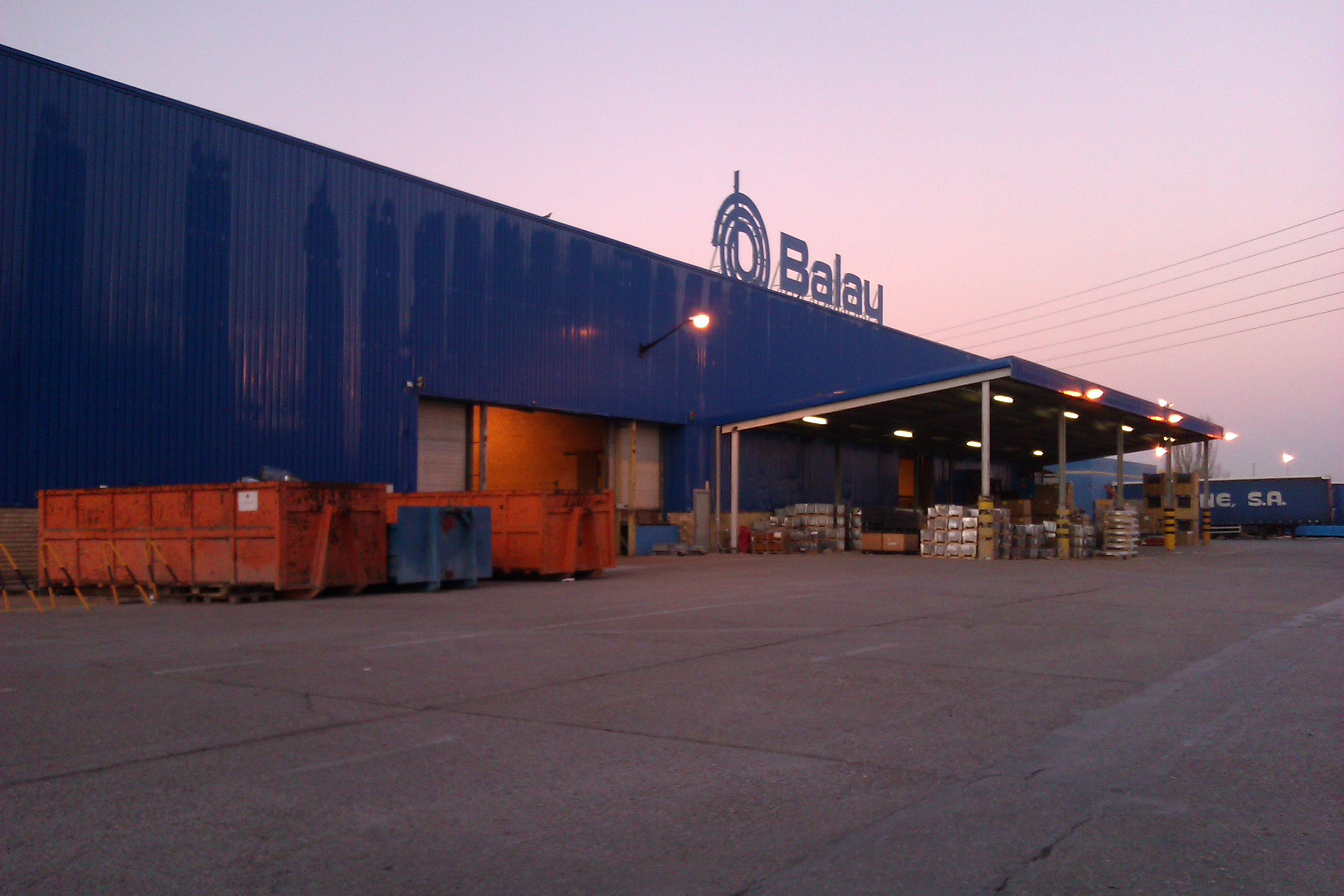
Balay factory in Montañana, Zaragoza

BSH Electrodomésticos España trading as Balay, is a Spanish home appliances manufacturer, owned by BSH.

Founded in 1947 by Esteban Bayona & José María Layrla, its headquarters are in Zaragoza, with plants in Zaragoza, Pamplona, Estella, Vitoria and Santander.

== Products ==
Balay manufactures products including:

- Washing machines
- Dryers
- Refrigerators
- Freezers
- Dishwashers
- Stovetops
- Ovens
- Microwaves
