= Fraunhofer Institute for Mechanics of Materials =

Research institute in Germany

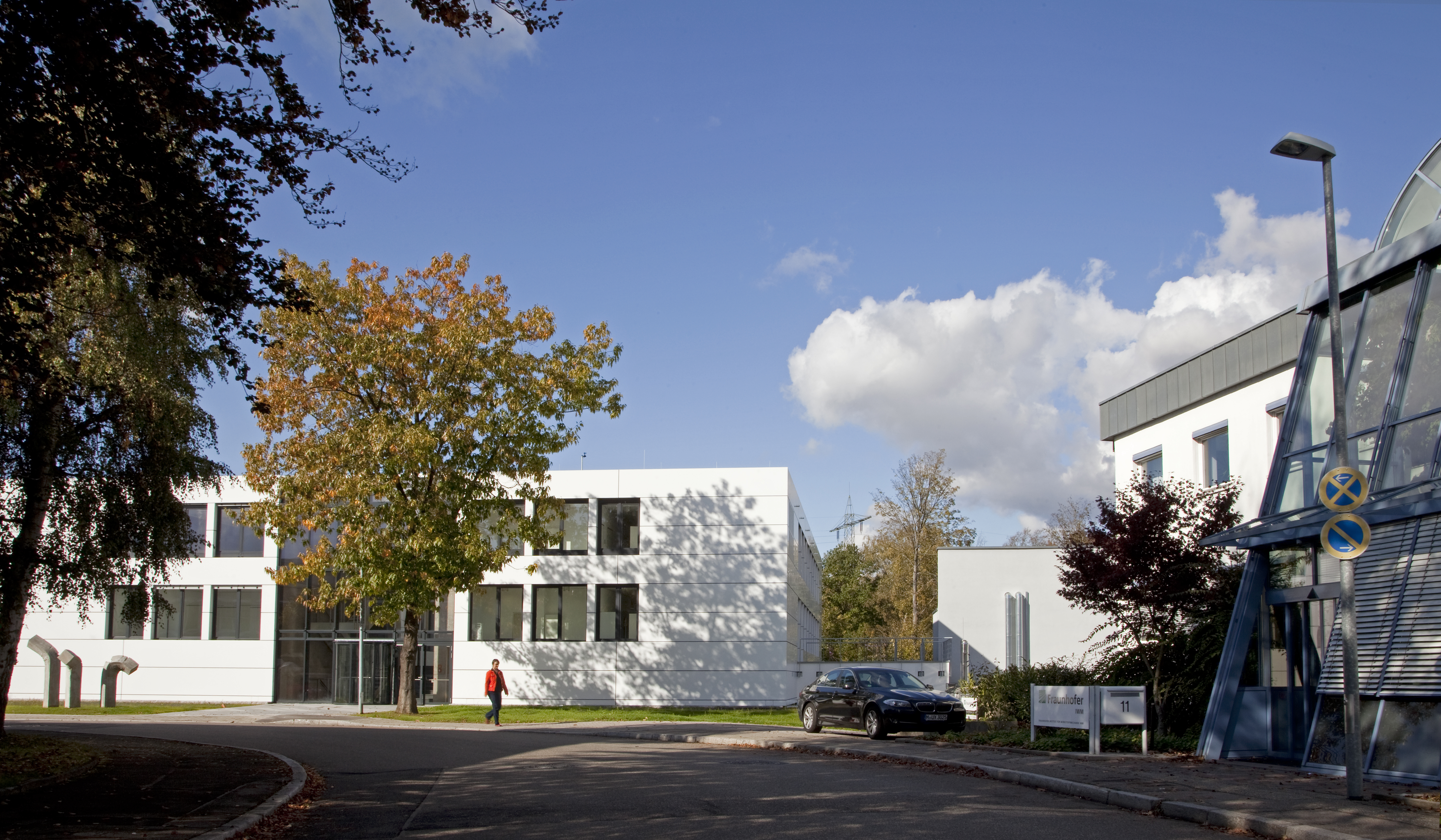
- Fraunhofer IWM in Freiburg in 2011
- Other name: German: Fraunhofer-Institut für Werkstoffmechanik; Fraunhofer IWM; IWM
- Parent institution: Fraunhofer-Gesellschaft
- Established: 1971; 55 years ago
- Focus: Applied contract research
- Director: Peter Gumbsch
- Staff: 324
- Formerly called: Fraunhofer Ernst Mach Institute
- Location: Wöhlerstr. 11, Freiburg im Breisgau (headquarters); and; Karlsruhe, Baden-Württemberg, Germany
- Coordinates: 48°02′01″N 7°51′07″E
- Interactive map of Fraunhofer Institute for Mechanics of Materials
- Website: www.iwm.fraunhofer.de/en.html (in English)

The Fraunhofer Institute for Mechanics of Materials (German: Fraunhofer-Institut für Werkstoffmechanik), abbreviated as Fraunhofer IWM, or simply IWM, is a research and development institute of the Fraunhofer Society, with research centers located in Freiburg im Breisgau, and in Karlsruhe, Baden-Württemberg, Germany. It focuses on partnering with industry and public clients in the areas of safety, reliability, durability and functionality of materials and components. It carries out development work for the evaluation and further development of highly stressed materials and components and the optimization of manufacturing processes.

== History ==
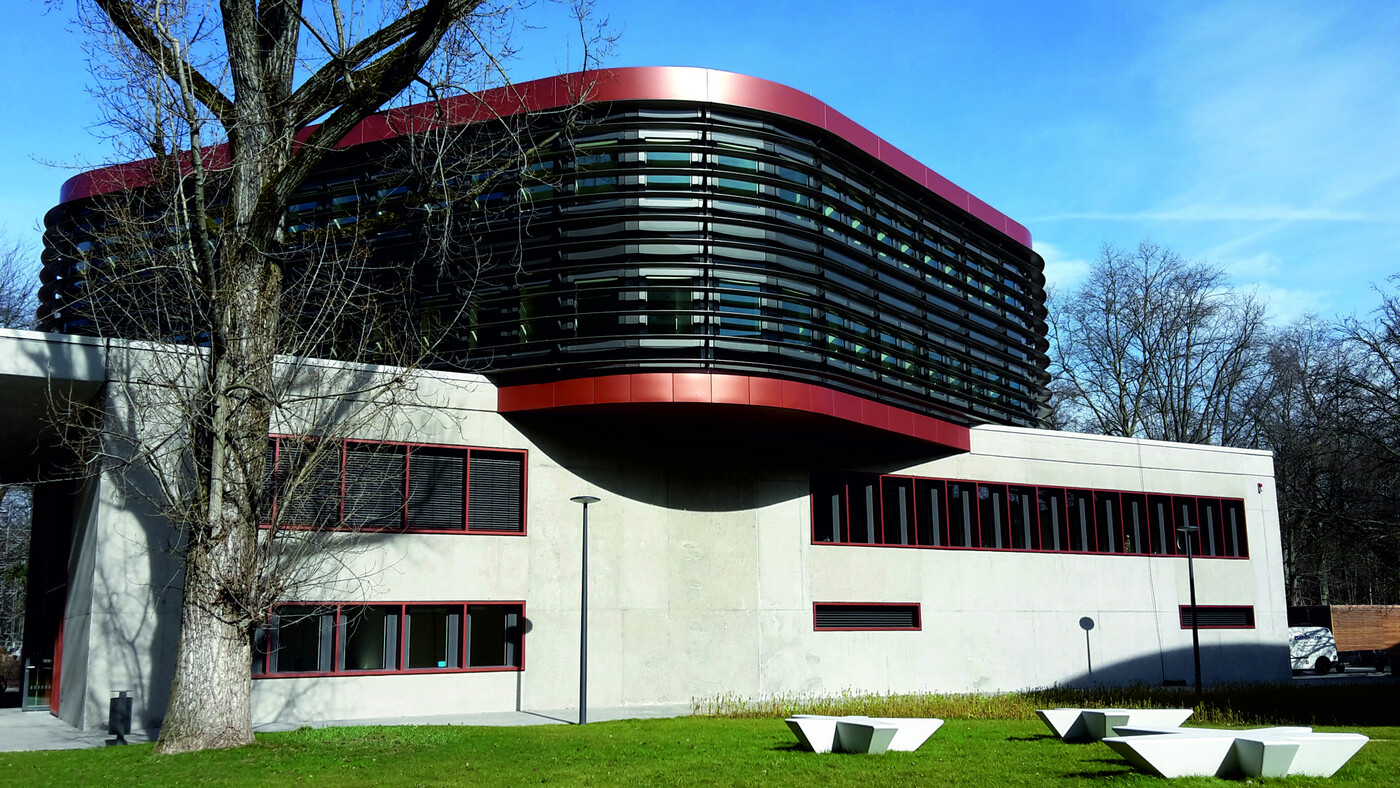
Fraunhofer IWM in Karlsruhe, opened in 2010

Fraunhofer IWM was founded in 1971 in Freiburg, (Breisgau), from the Fraunhofer Ernst Mach Institute. On the recommendation of the Science Council, Fraunhofer IWM expanded in Halle an der Saale in 1992 to include a working group from the former Institute for Solid State Physics and Electron Microscopy of the GDR Academy of Sciences. In 2010, Karlsruhe was added as a further location. The Halle branch of Fraunhofer IWM became the independent Fraunhofer Institute for Microstructure of Materials and Systems IMWS on January 1, 2016.

== Mission and focus ==
The Fraunhofer Institute for Mechanics of Materials IWM provides research and development services for companies and public clients. The research content and development goals include improving or ensuring the function, energy efficiency, safety and durability of technical components and systems. The institute supports industrial and service companies in overcoming material technology challenges in all life phases of components, development, production and operation.

Driving factors for research and development at Fraunhofer IWM are, for example, the energy efficiency of machines and systems, resource-saving manufacturing of products, sustainable mobility as well as the substitution of critical materials or changed operating conditions of systems in the course of the energy transition. The recyclability of materials and components and the use of materials of indeterminate origin, even in high-performance systems, is becoming increasingly important. Laws and regulations on the use of materials as well as digital twins that accompany product development and production are making the availability and handling of material data in development and production processes a success factor that is increasingly becoming a prerequisite for resource-conserving and innovative value creation.

With its expertise in materials science, the institute bridges the gap between the behavior and properties of materials and the functionality, efficiency, safety and durability of the technical systems produced from them. The employees research the effects of mechanical, tribological, thermal, electrical and chemical stresses on the functionality and durability of materials and develop solutions so that these can be safeguarded and adjusted. They make it possible to calculate the behavior and properties of materials in process chains, components and machines, thus opening up scope for innovation and design for resource efficiency as well as the performance of products and technical systems.

At a national level, the Fraunhofer IWM is currently playing a key role in the digitalization of materials. Since 2020, it has been coordinating the National Research Data Infrastructure for Materials Research and Materials Technology (nfdi-matwerk) and has been significantly involved in the MaterialDigital initiative of the Federal Ministry of Education and Research since 2019.

== Business units ==
Fraunhofer IWM is organized into four business units that cover materials technology issues in all phases of the life cycle of components and systems, from materials development, materials processing and the evaluation of materials and components in use through to end-of-life.

- Component Safety and Lightweight Design: Research and development services to evaluate, predict and guarantee the safety, reliability, structural integrity and suitability for use of components in machines, systems, vehicles and hydrogen technologies are at the heart of this business unit. The aim is to deal safely with faults in components. The combination of experimental, data-based and numerical component evaluation creates the basis for decisions on approval and safe use, inspection, maintenance, replacement and continued operation.
- Materials Evaluation and Service Life Concepts: For manufacturers and operators of thermo-mechanically and/or chemically and structurally highly stressed systems, this business unit provides reliable statements on the service life of the components and materials used, developing measures to safeguard them. Examples of applications include the use of infrastructures for transporting hydrogen, increasing the capacity of energy storage systems and ensuring the reliability of turbines. To this end, the R&D services establish the link between the processes that take place in the microstructure of materials and their effects on the longevity of the corresponding systems.
- Manufacturing Processes: Supports its clients in adjusting the quality, function and contour accuracy of components in production steps. To this end, the development of material properties through the process steps is tracked experimentally and numerically, described and related to the respective process parameters. The derived process-structure-property relationships are used to identify and influence critical factors for material and energy efficiency in production and for the performance of components. The focus is on shaping processes in glass processing, sheet metal processing and powder technology.
- Tribology: New drive systems, hydrogen technologies, complex system requirements due to off-shore operation and/or alternative fuels as well as the substitution of critical materials, e.g. in lubricants or seals, all bring with them diverse and in some cases new friction and wear mechanisms that determine the material and energy efficiency of the systems. Using a combined multi-scale approach of experimentation, analysis and simulation in conjunction with the development of suitable material solutions, this business unit is working to make friction and wear in its customers' systems predictable and to adjust them for greater performance and efficiency.
