= Thermador =

Kitchen appliance brand

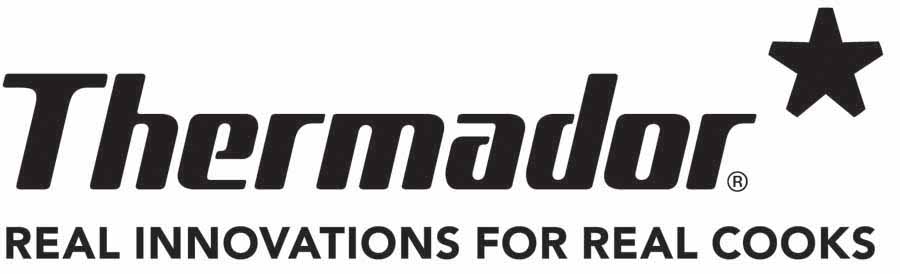
- Industry: Kitchen appliances
- Founded: 1916
- Headquarters: Irvine, California, U.S.
- Products: Ranges, rangetops, ovens, cooktops, ventilation, warming drawers, microwaves, built-in coffee machines, refrigerators and dishwashers
- Parent: BSH Hausgeräte GmbH
- Website: thermador.com/

Thermador is an American brand of high-end kitchen appliances. It is part of BSH Home Appliances Corporation, a fully owned subsidiary of BSH Hausgeräte GmbH, the sixth largest appliance manufacturer in the world in 2022. The Thermador brand specializes in equipment such as ovens, ranges, cooktops, refrigerators and dishwashers.

== History ==
Thermador invented the first wall oven and cooktop, and introduced stainless steel to home appliances. By 1948, Thermador introduced the first "Pro Range" for residential use. Patterned after commercial restaurant equipment, Thermador developed the first home version warming drawer in 1952, a kitchen appliance that warmed dishes and foods while the oven was in use. Thermador continued to improve on kitchen appliances with the first self-cleaning oven in 1963.

During the 1970s, Thermador continued to innovate. In 1970, the company released the first "smooth top" cooktop using material developed by Corning Incorporated. Julia Child used a Thermador oven in her critically acclaimed PBS TV series. Thermador appliances were also featured in the American television show The Brady Bunch. In 1976, Thermador introduced the first "Speedcooking" oven, which combined thermal heat with microwave energy to cook up to 35 percent faster than conventional ovens.

Thermador was bought in 1998 by BSH (Bosch und Siemens Hausgeräte), then a joint Bosch-Siemens company, but since 2015 solely owned by the Bosch company.

== Manufacturing locations of Thermador appliances ==
Thermador appliances are manufactured in different locations, depending on the type and model of the product. Most of them are made in the USA, in BSH’s factories in New Bern, North Carolina, and La Follette, Tennessee. These factories produce Thermador’s refrigerators, ovens, ranges, dishwashers, and ventilation systems, except for some high-end models that are assembled in Europe at BSH’s locations in Germany and other countries.

Thermador also has Technology and Development Centers in Oakridge and Caryville, Tennessee, and New Bern, North Carolina, where it conducts research and development for its products. Thermador’s headquarters is in Irvine, California, where it oversees its marketing, sales, and customer service operations.
