= Gaggenau Hausgeräte =

German high-end home appliances manufacturer

Gaggenau Hausgeräte GmbH
- Type: Gesellschaft mit beschränkter Haftung
- Founded: 1683; 343 years ago Black Forest
- Headquarters: Munich, Germany
- Products: Home appliances
- Parent: BSH Hausgeräte
- Website: www.gaggenau.com

Gaggenau Hausgeräte (German for 'Gaggenau Home Appliances') is a German manufacturer of high-end home appliances. The company was established in 1683 as the Eisenwerke Gaggenau A.G. in the Black Forest region of south-west Germany by German aristocrat Louis William, Margrave of Baden-Baden.

The company’s roots began in extractive metallurgy, smelting base metal from ore and forging hammers and nails out of a hammer mill. During the Industrial Revolution, the company was transitioned by CEO Michael Flürscheim from forging nails to producing farming machinery. By the 1880s, the company became enamel specialists; at the turn of the century, it began producing bicycles and cast products under the brand name Badenia.

It is currently a subsidiary of Bosch-Siemens Hausgeräte (BSH Hausgeräte). In 2008, the company won the IF Design Awards in every category in which it had nominations.

== History ==
=== 1683 to 1900 ===
Gaggenau Hausgeräte was founded in 1683 in the Black Forest region of Germany by aristocrat Louis William, Margrave of Baden-Baden. In 1873 Michael Flürscheim became the company’s CEO, and affiliated Gaggenau Hausgeräte with the German railway network. The company also diversified; Flürscheim liquidated the nail forging business and switched to producing farming machinery in response to the Industrial Revolution. In 1879, the inventor and entrepreneur Theodor Bergmann joined the company, which he expanded through a range of products including enamel. By the 1880s, the company ran a successful business producing hardwearing advertising signs for companies such as Odol, Maggi and Stollwerck. In 1893, Bergmann left the company and the company started focusing production on bicycles and cast products (such as coal and gas-fired stoves) under the brand name Badenia.

=== 1991 to 1998 ===
From 1991 to 1998, Timothy Jacob Jensen served as Gaggenau Hausgeräte’s chief designer, creating and developing a range of products, including ceramic hobs, built-in ovens, extractor hoods, dishwashers, washing machines, and tumble dryers. These include the EB900 Built-in oven and CK494 Glass ceramic hob. In 1995, Gaggenau Hausgeräte was acquired by Bosch-Siemens Hausgeräte (BSH Hausgeräte).

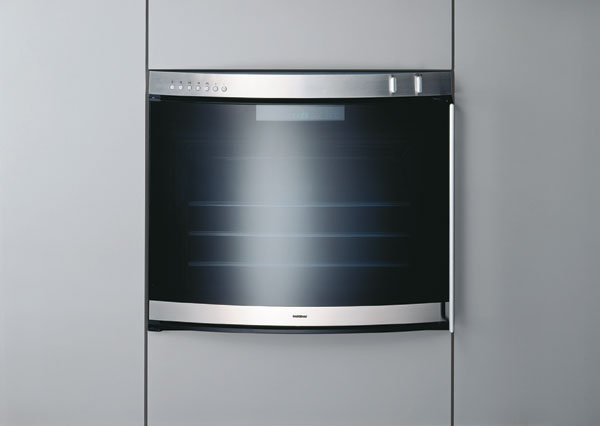
Gaggenau EB900 stove, 1993

=== 1998 to present ===
Gaggenau has been a subsidiary of Munich-based BSH Hausgeräte (en: BSH Home Appliances) since 1995.

== Products ==
Under the brand name Gaggenau, the Gaggenau company and BSH manufacture the following products:

- Convection ovens
- Combination ovens (convection and steam)
- Warming drawers
- Microwave ovens
- Coffee machines
- Cooktops
- Kitchen hoods
- Refrigerators
- Freezers
- Wine cabinets
- Dishwashers

== Production ==
Most of Gaggenau products are made in Germany or produced in France at the Lipsheim factory.
