= Constructa (company) =

German appliance brand

Constructa-Neff Vertriebs-GmbH
- Predecessor: Peter Pfenningsberg GmbH
- Founded: 1951
- Products: washing machines
- Parent: BSH Hausgeräte
- Website: www.constructa.com

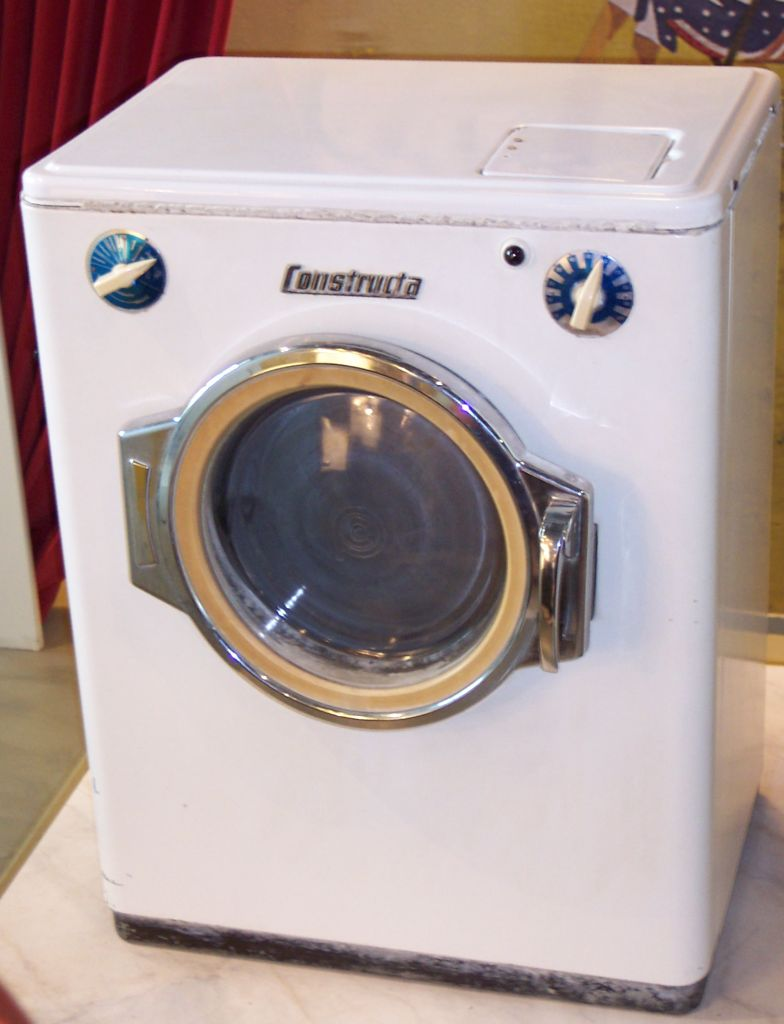
One of the 1st washing machines of Constructa

Constructa is a German brand from the company Constructa-Neff Vertriebs-GmbH, making major appliances based in Munich. The company is a part of BSH Hausgeräte. At the beginning of the 1950s, the first German household washing machine with a glazed front door (the "porthole") was developed under this name and launched on the market. Constructa was in the 1950s and 1960s the leading German provider of fully automatic washing machines.

== Sources ==
- Die Quecke Ratinger und Angerländer Heimatblätter 1998 page 168 ff.
- Susanne Hilger: «Amerikanisierung» deutscher Unternehmen: Wettbewerbsstrategien und Unternehmenspolitik bei Henkel, Siemens und Daimler-Benz (1945/49–1975). Wiesbaden: Franz Steiner Verlag, 2004, page 138 ff.
