= Steinway (disambiguation) =

Steinway may refer to:

- Steinway & Sons, an American-German piano company

== People ==
- C.F. Theodore Steinway, son of Henry E. Steinway
- Henry A. Steinway, record producer and DJ performing as RL Grime
- Henry E. Steinway, piano technician and founder of Steinway & Sons
- Henry Z. Steinway, piano technician and great-grandson of Henry E. Steinway
- Theodore E. Steinway, piano technician, philatelist and son of William Steinway
- William Steinway, piano technician, civil leader and son of Henry E. Steinway

== Places ==
- Steinway Hall, a building housing concert halls, showrooms and sales departments for Steinway & Sons pianos
- Steinway Mansion, a historic home in Astoria, Queens, New York City, the United States
- Steinway Street, a major street in Astoria, Queens, New York City, the United States
- Steinway Street (IND Queens Boulevard Line), a subway station in Astoria, Queens, New York City, the United States
- Steinway Tunnel, a subway tunnel in Manhattan and Queens, New York City, the United States
- The Steinway Tower, a residential skyscraper in Manhattan, New York City, the United States

== Other ==
- Steinway Car, a subway car
- Steinway Lyngdorf, audio systems
- Steinway Musical Instruments, a musical instrument manufacturing conglomerate and parent company of Steinway & Sons
- Steinway Omnibus, a bus company
- Steinway Transit Corporation, a bus company
