= Timothy Jacob Jensen =

Danish industrial designer (born 1962)

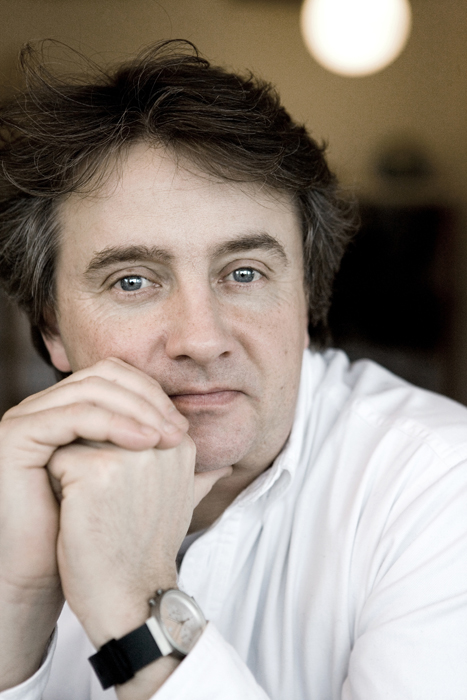
- Jensen in 2010
- Born: 27 April 1962 (age 64); Copenhagen, Denmark
- Occupations: Designer, professor
- Known for: Jacob Jensen Design
- Movement: Danish modern
- Awards: List of awards
- Website: timothyjacobjensen.com

Timothy Jacob Jensen (born 27 April 1962) is a Danish industrial designer. He is best known for his design style and entrepreneurial work, including work with the Jacob Jensen design tradition.

As the son of designer Jacob Jensen, he began his career at an early age and became chief designer of Jacob Jensen Design in 1982. He later was CEO and led the company's global expansion, collaborating with brands such as Bang & Olufsen, Gaggenau, ECCO, Panasonic, LG, Steinway Lyngdorf, and Vertu.

Jensen's work spans a wide range of products, including watches, home electronics, kitchen appliances, and jewelry. Several of his designs are included in the permanent collection of The Museum of Modern Art in New York.

He was named Designer of the Year in China in 2017, appointed to the jury of the iF Design Award in 2019, and in 2024 was a Global Elite Jury member at Shanghai Design 100+. He is considered the most awarded Danish designer and the head of the most award-winning design family in the world. Jensen is also the founder of the Designers Trust platform and the By Timothy brand, and has held academic and advisory roles in China and Denmark. He has been described as "King of Design" for his contributions, and in 2025 he was appointed Copenhagen Goodwill Ambassador.

== Early career ==
Jensen started working in his father’s design studio in 1978. During this period, Jensen worked alongside Jacob Jensen, his father, and David Lewis, the chief designers of Bang & Olufsen. He designed his first car, "Logicar", when he was 19 years old. When he was 22 years old, he designed the Jacob Jensen Classic wristwatch, later included in The Museum of Modern Art's design collection in New York. In 1982, he became chief designer of Jacob Jensen Design. In 1985, he opened his own studio in Copenhagen called Voss Foerlev & Jensen. The same year, he designed the Classic series models wristwatches 510 and 520, which were included at the design study collection in the Museum of Modern Art (New York City) and received “Watch of the Year” award in 1996. The studio closed in 1988, at which time Jensen started collaborating with various international designers including Ross Litell in Como, Italy and Gerry Musset in Melbourne, Australia.

== Career ==
In 1990, Jensen took over Jacob Jensen Design in Hejlskov and became the company's CEO and chief designer. During that time the company designed watches, clocks, jewellery, smoke alarms, telephones, kitchen products, and other products. As both CEO and Chief Designer, he led the expansion of the Jacob Jensen to over 30 countries.

Jensen developed Jacob Jensen Design internationally, collaborating with numerous major companies including ECCO (Danish shoe manufacturer), Gaggenau Hausgeräte, Bang & Olufsen, Haier, LG, Panasonic, Steinway Lyngdorf (Steinway and Sons), Toshiba, Vertu, Lufthansa, and Volvo. From 1991 to 1998, he worked as associate chief designer for Gaggenau Hausgeräte's design programme, where he designed ceramic hobs, built-in ovens, extractor hoods, dishwashers, washing machines and tumble dryers. A number of these products received awards including the EB900 Built-in oven and CK494 Glass ceramic hob.

In 2011, Jensen founded his first subsidiary, the Jacob Jensen Design / DeTao Shanghai studio. The studio was created in collaboration with the DeTao Group at SIVA Campus in Shanghai. In 2014, Jacob Jensen Design established its second subsidiary studio named Jacob Jensen Design / KMUTT Bangkok. The studio was founded in collaboration with King Mongkut's University of Technology Thonburi. Timothy Jensen was named Designer of the Year in China in 2017 and later served as a jury member for the iF Design Award in 2019.

In May 2018, Jensen terminated his position and sold all of his shares from Jacob Jensen Design and stopped working for the company in October of the same year. Also in 2018, he launched Timothy Jacob Jensen studio (Timothyjacobjensenstudios.com).

In 2020, together with investors and collaborators, Jensen initiated the creation of Designers Trust, which launched in March 2021. The platform is designed to give creators access to projects, accreditation, and equitable pay.

In March 2026, Jensen was a spoke at the World Design Capital (WDC) Busan International Conference where he presented on value-driven design.

== By Timothy ==
In 2021, Jensen founded By Timothy (bytimothy.dk), a design brand created in partnership with global collaborators. In June 2022, the Skive Municipality gave Barack Obama and his family four wrist watches by the By Timothy brand. The watches were designed by Timothy Jensen and his daughter.

== Other work ==
In 1996 Jensen was an advisor to the Cultural Affairs Committee of the Danish government, and in 1997, he was listed in Who's Who. He was appointed as Master of the DeTao Masters Academy in Beijing in 2011. He was later appointed as Honorary professor at the Shanghai Institute of Visual Art (SIVA), China. Jensen was subsequently awarded the title of High-level Expert by the China Industrial Design Association (CIDA). He currently also serves as a lecturer at universities, companies, and other institutions. Timothy Jacob Jensen was appointed by the iF International Forum Design to be jury member of iF design Award 2019 in the "Discipline Product" category.

In 2017 Jensen was named Designer of the Year in China, and in 2019 he was selected as jury member for the iF Product Design Award. Jensen is considered the most awarded Danish designer, heading the most award-winning design family in the world.

In 2024, he was a Global Elite Jury member at Shanghai Design 100+62. Jensen is considered the most awarded Danish designer, heading the most award-winning design family in the world.

== Design Style ==
Jensen developed his father's design works, which involved the merging of the International style (architecture) and MAYA. Jensen turned his father's two-dimensional graphic works into three-dimensional designs, applying this to multiple major brands including Gaggenau, Vertu, Steinway Lyngdorf (Steinway & Sons), and JACOB JENSEN. Jensen's maxim is "Form follows feeling." Works by the Jensen family are known to have played a notable role in European design. Jensen's maxim is "Form follows feeling." Works by the Jensen family are known to have played a notable role in European design. The MAYA approach, initiated by Raymond Loewy, involved integrating new design elements with familiar features. Jacob Jensen evolved MAYA to create innovative yet recognizable archetypes. Jacob Jensen employed the MAYA approach through his minimalist and functional designs for Bang & Olufsen and later his own studio, with designs such as the Beogram turntables, which fused advanced technology and intuitive use. Jensen continued his father's approach by integrating contemporary technology and design with simplicity and practicality.

=== Monogram ===
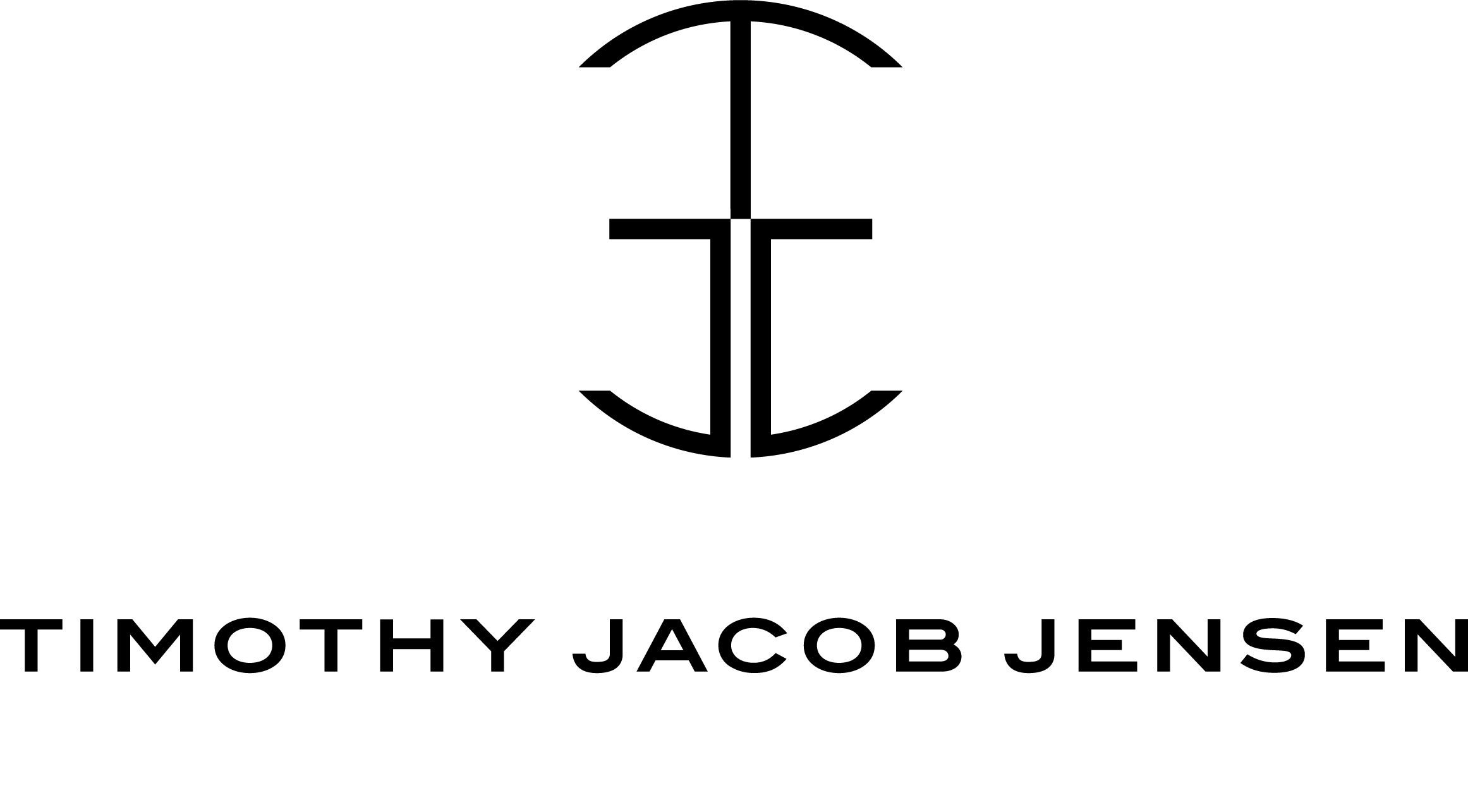
TJJ Monogram

The Timothy Jacob Jensen monogram is based on an early assignment his father gave him when he began as an apprentice in 1978. This involved drawing vertical lines representing "life", horizontal lines representing "death", and circles representing "life’s cycles". This exercise formed the basis for Jensen's brand signature.

== Works ==
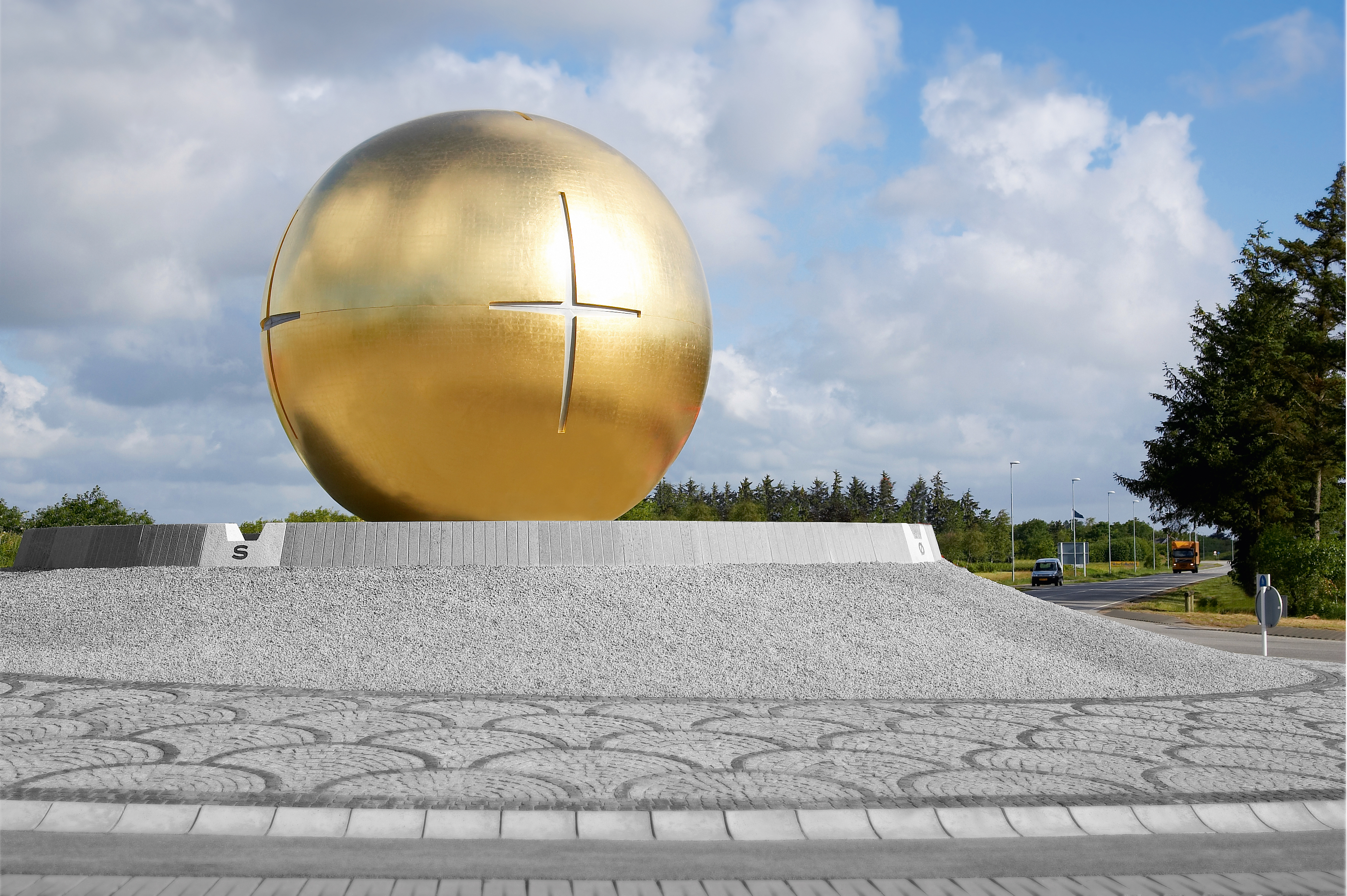

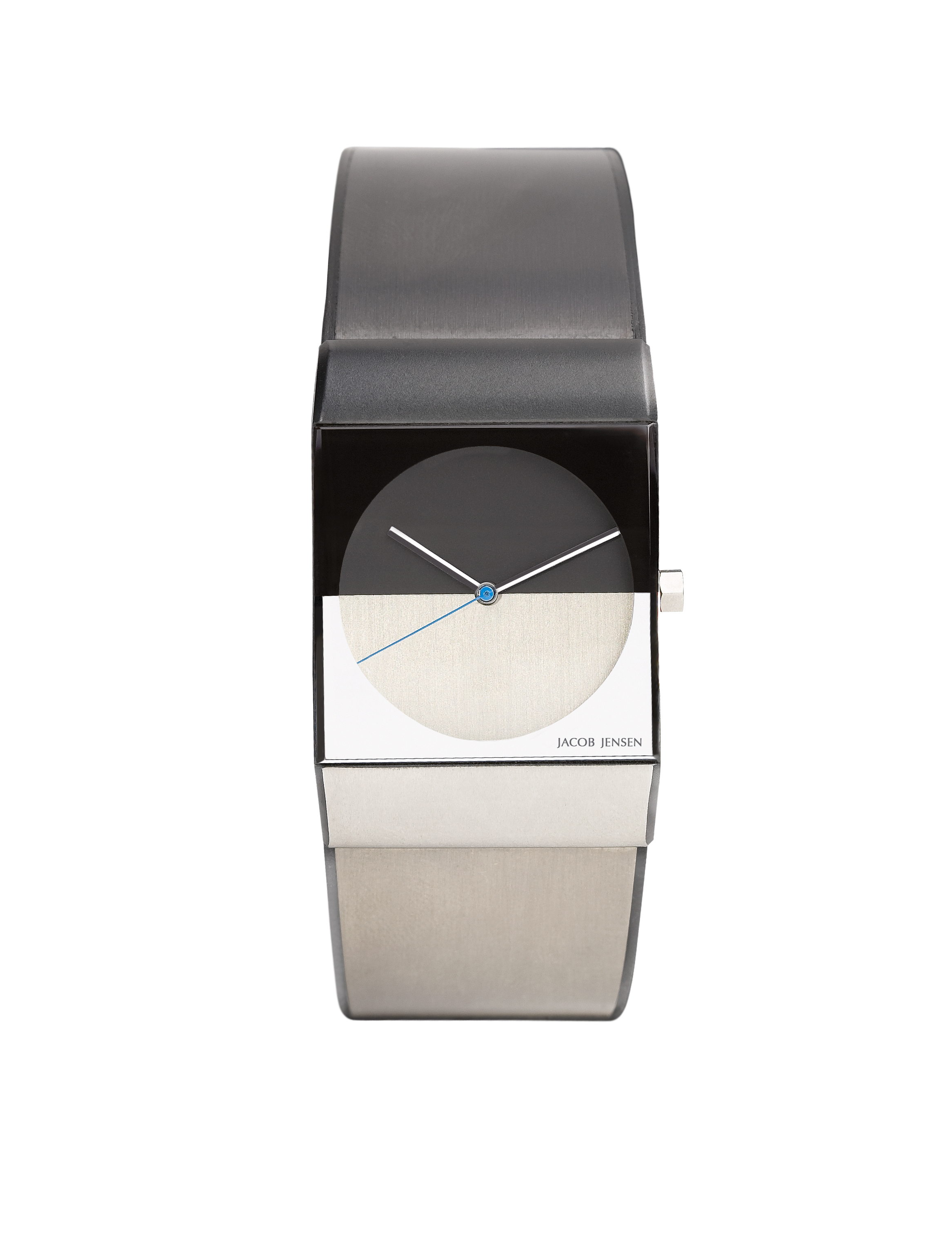

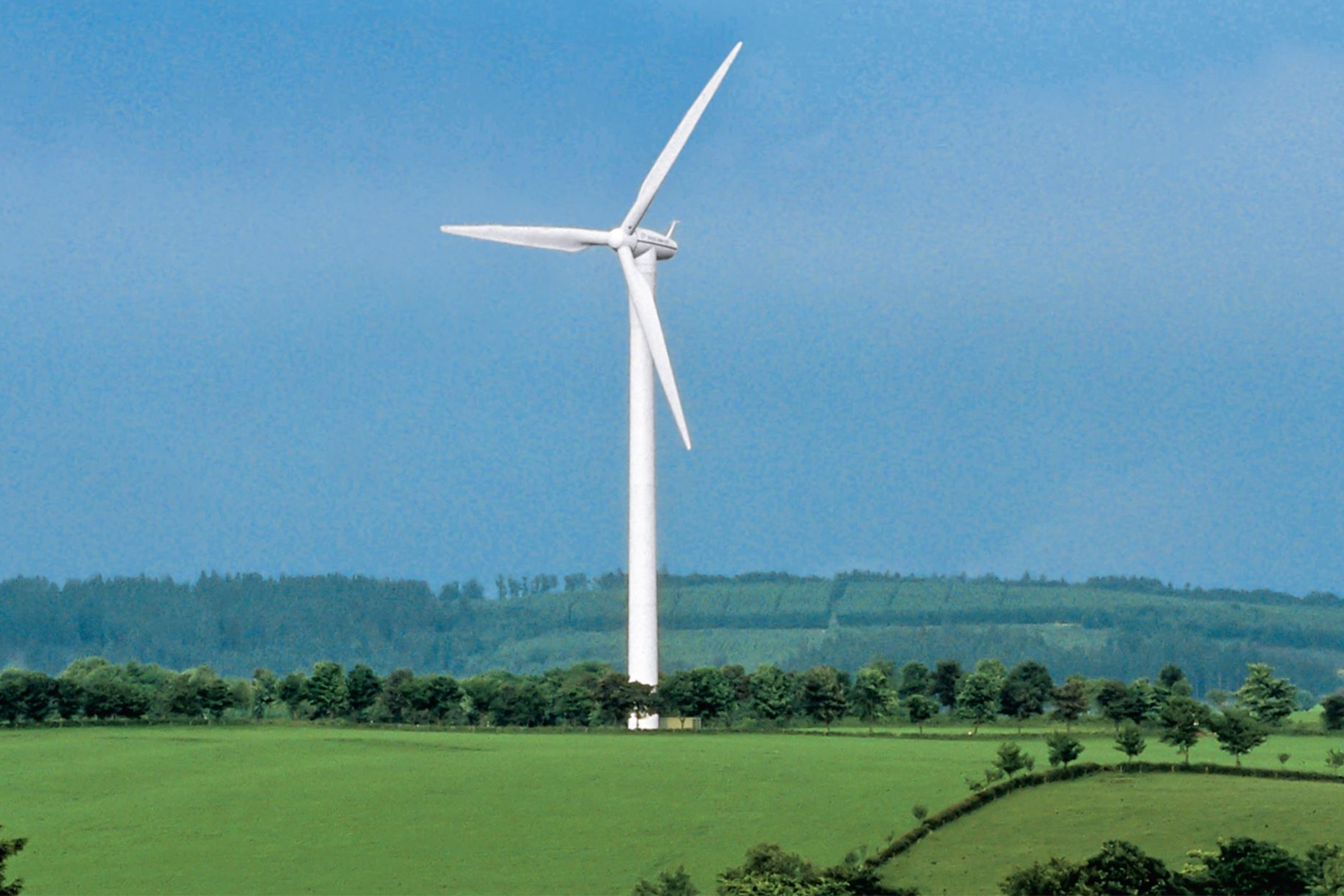

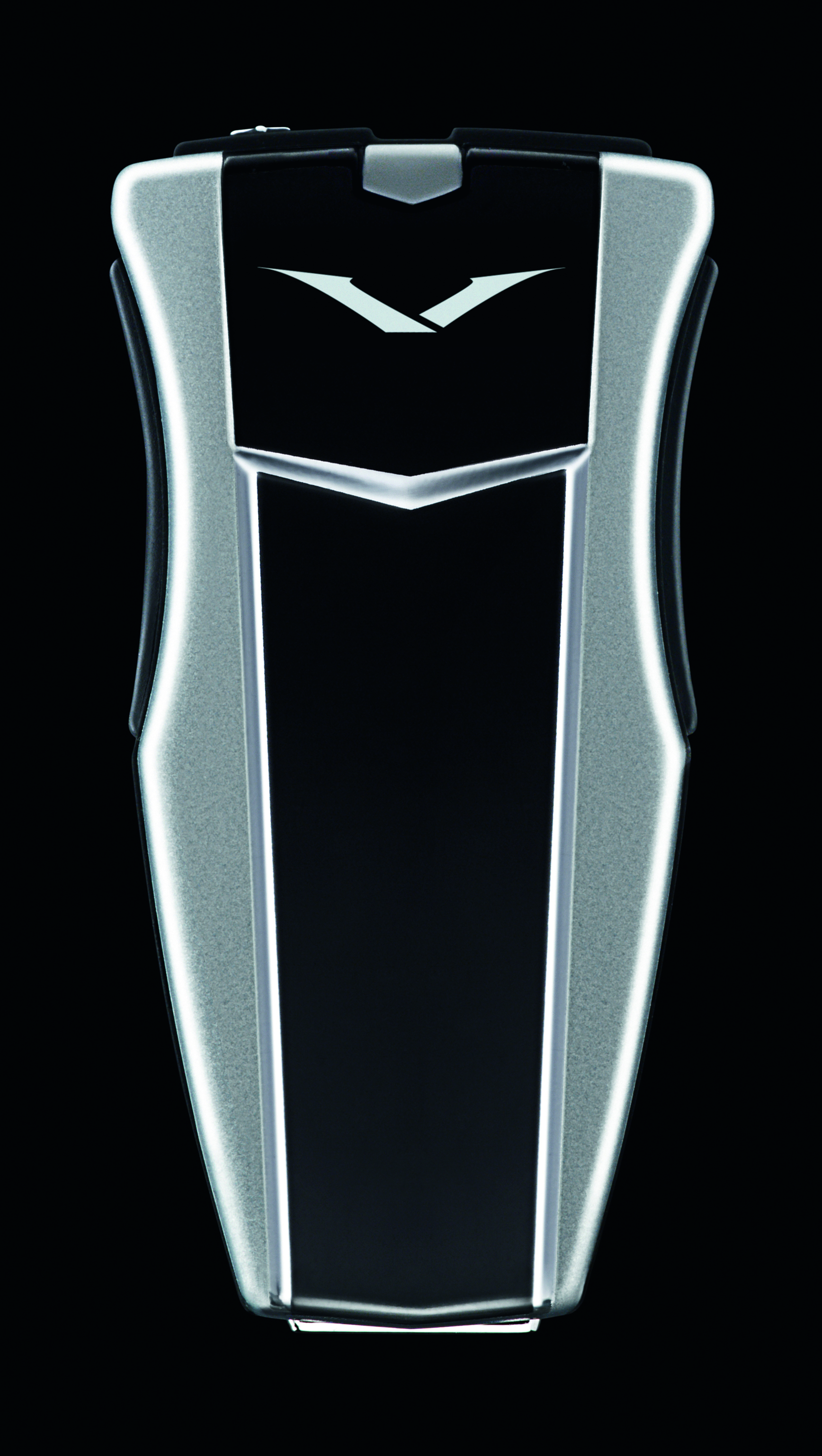

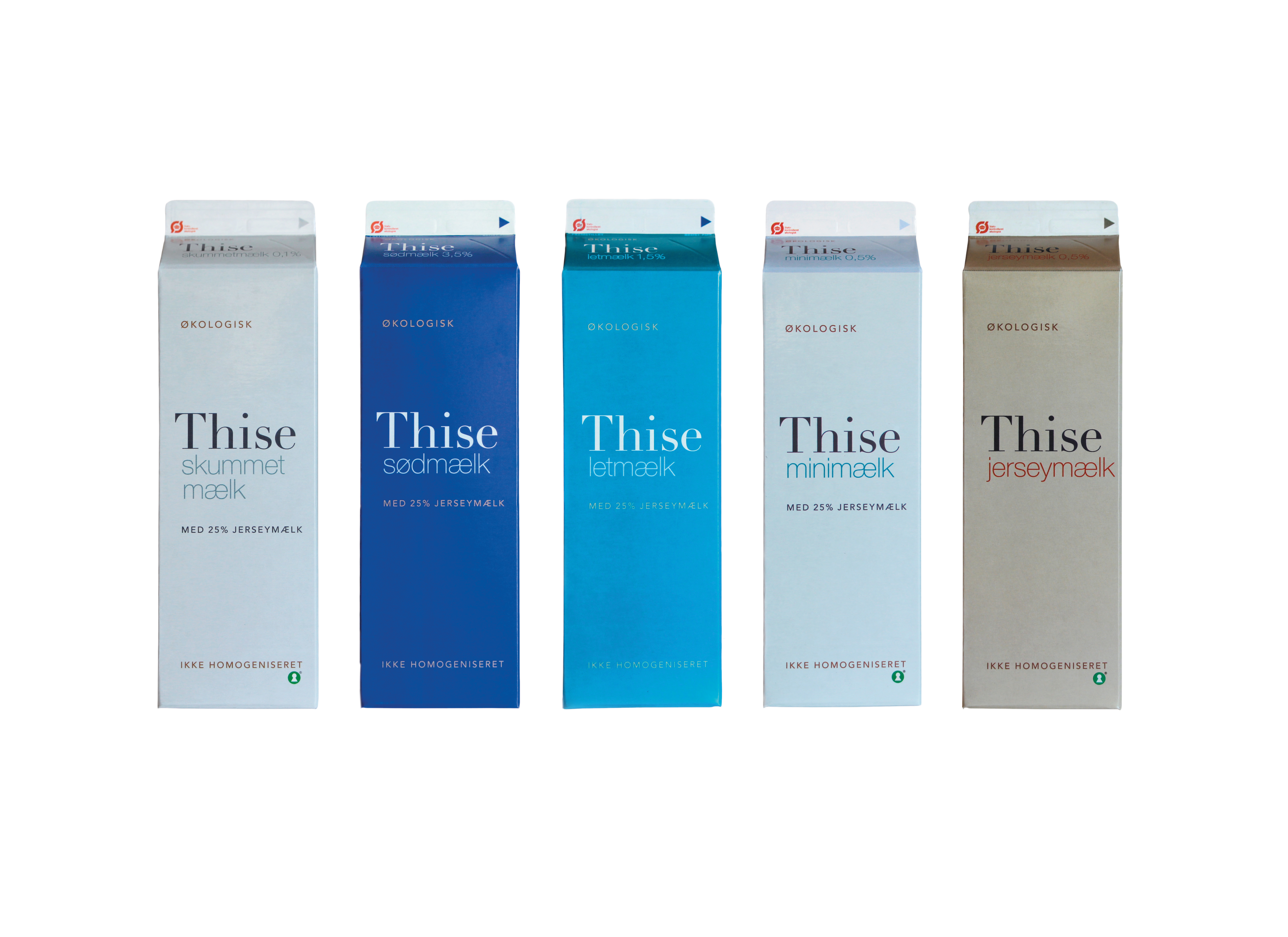

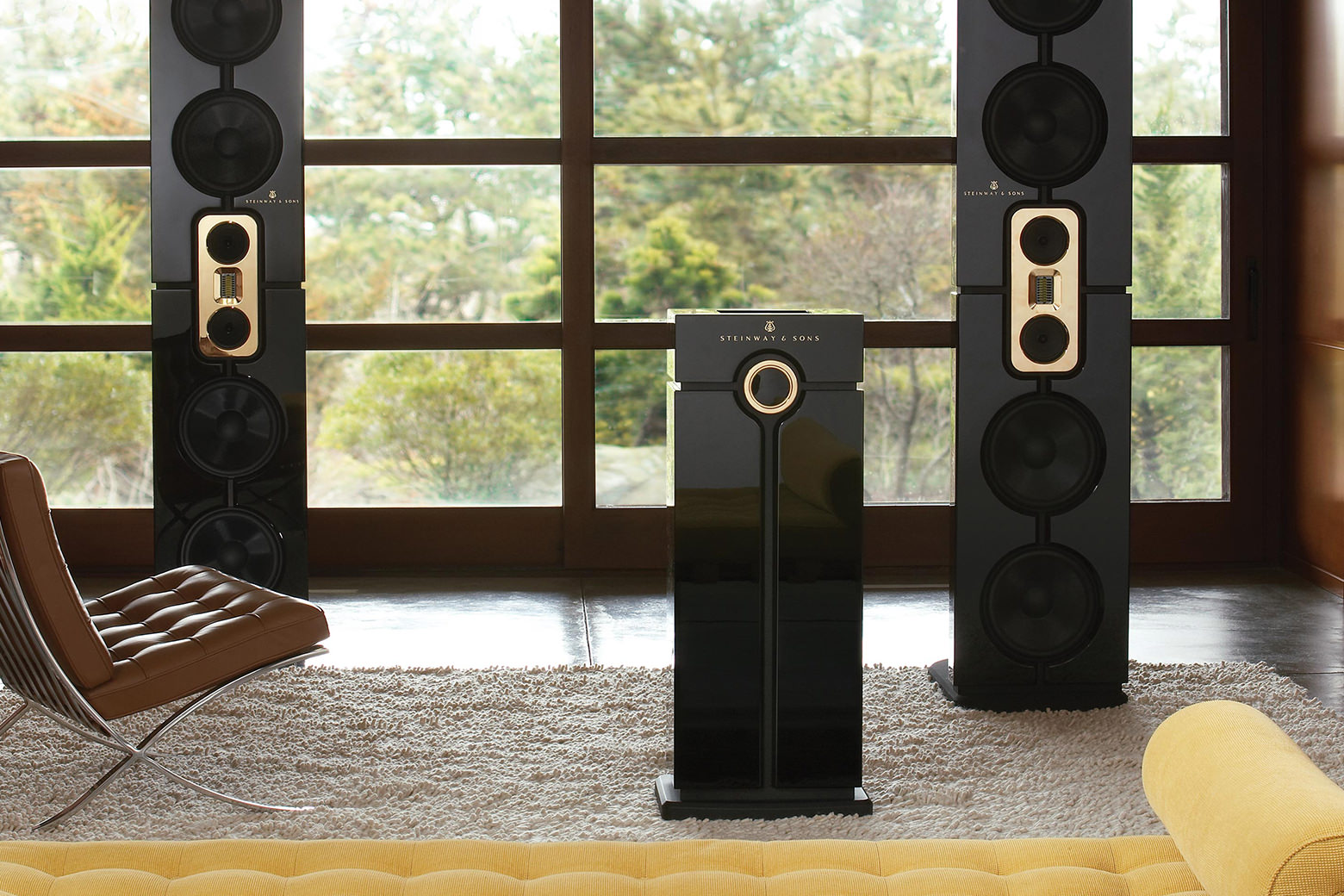

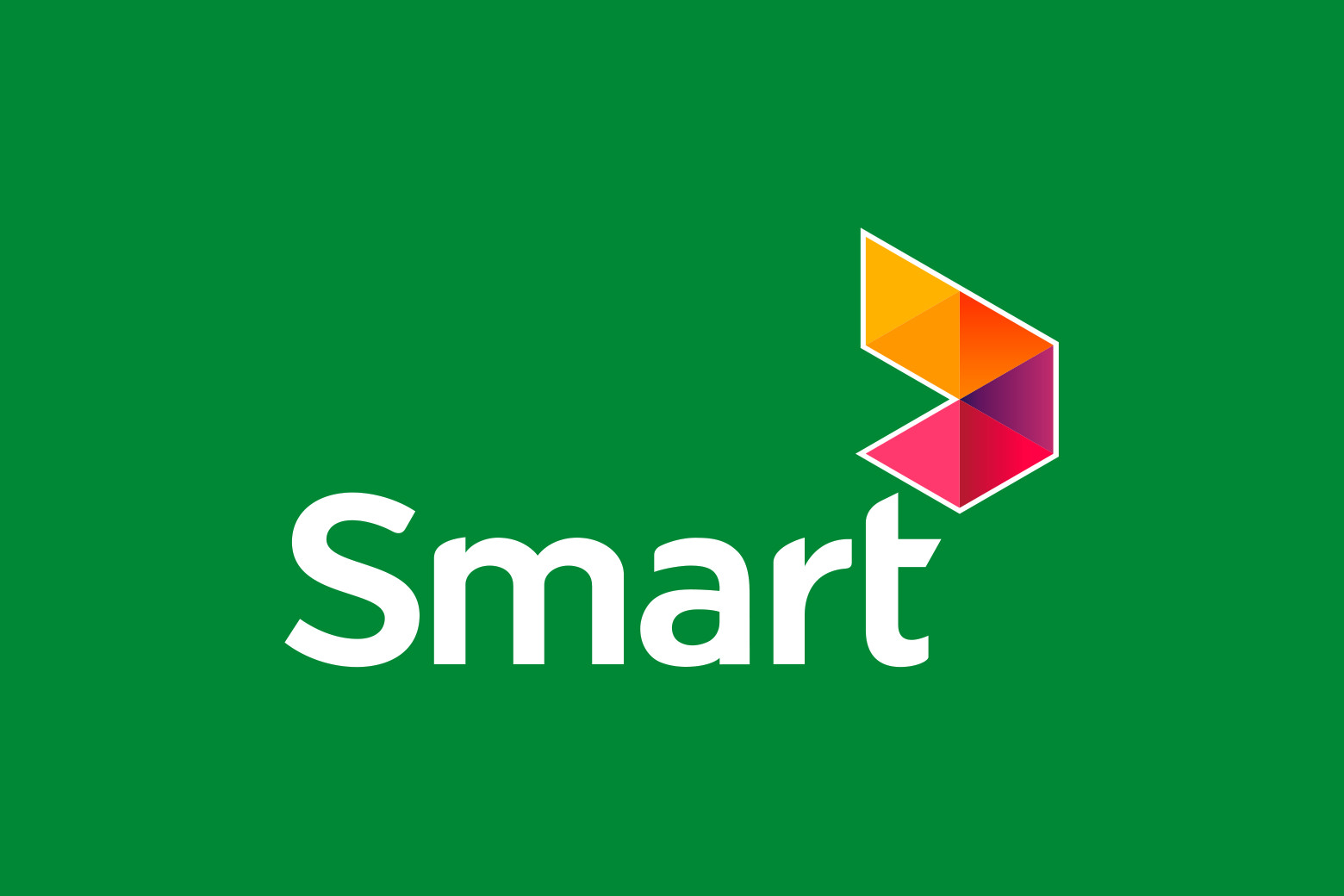

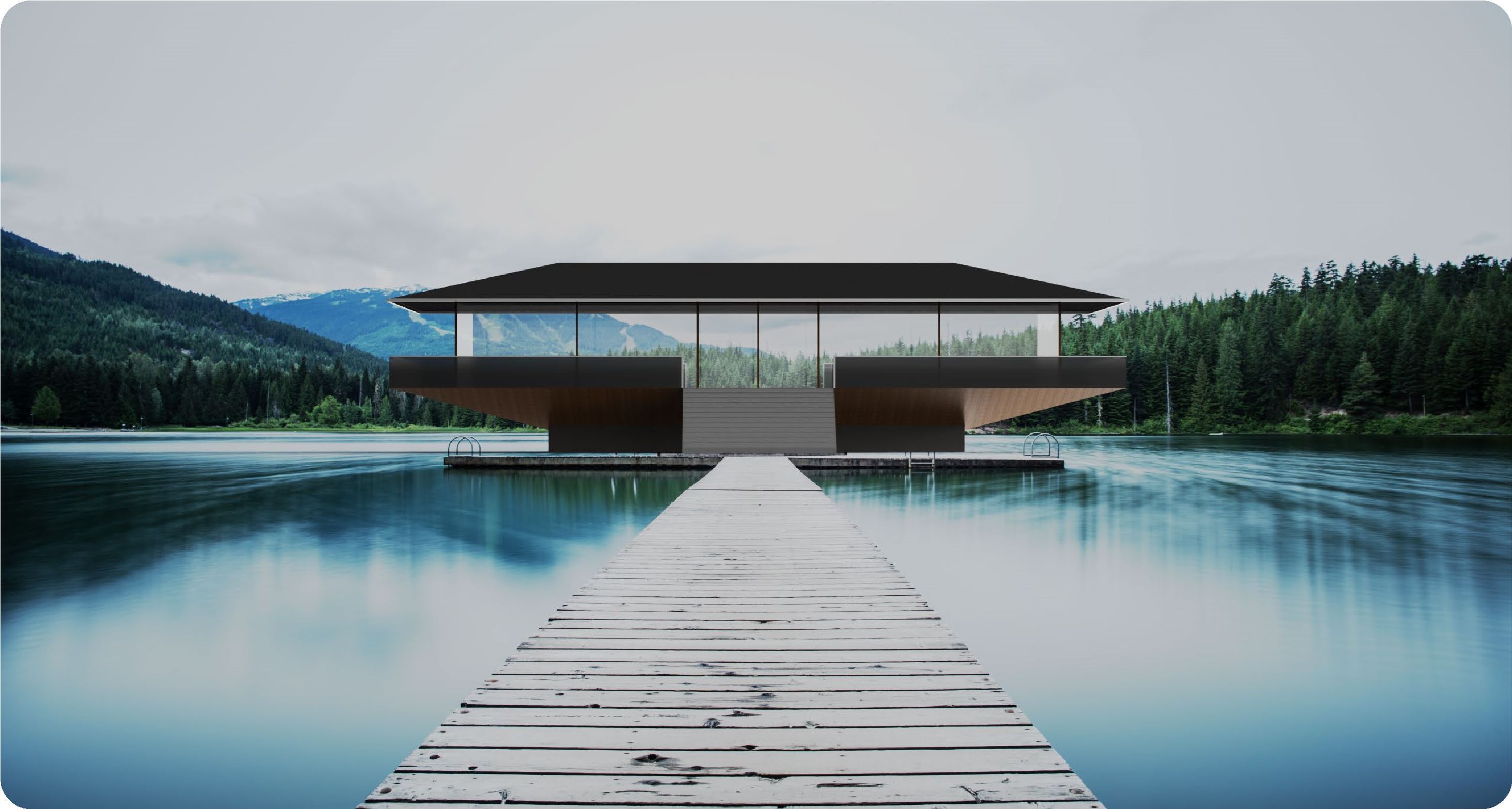

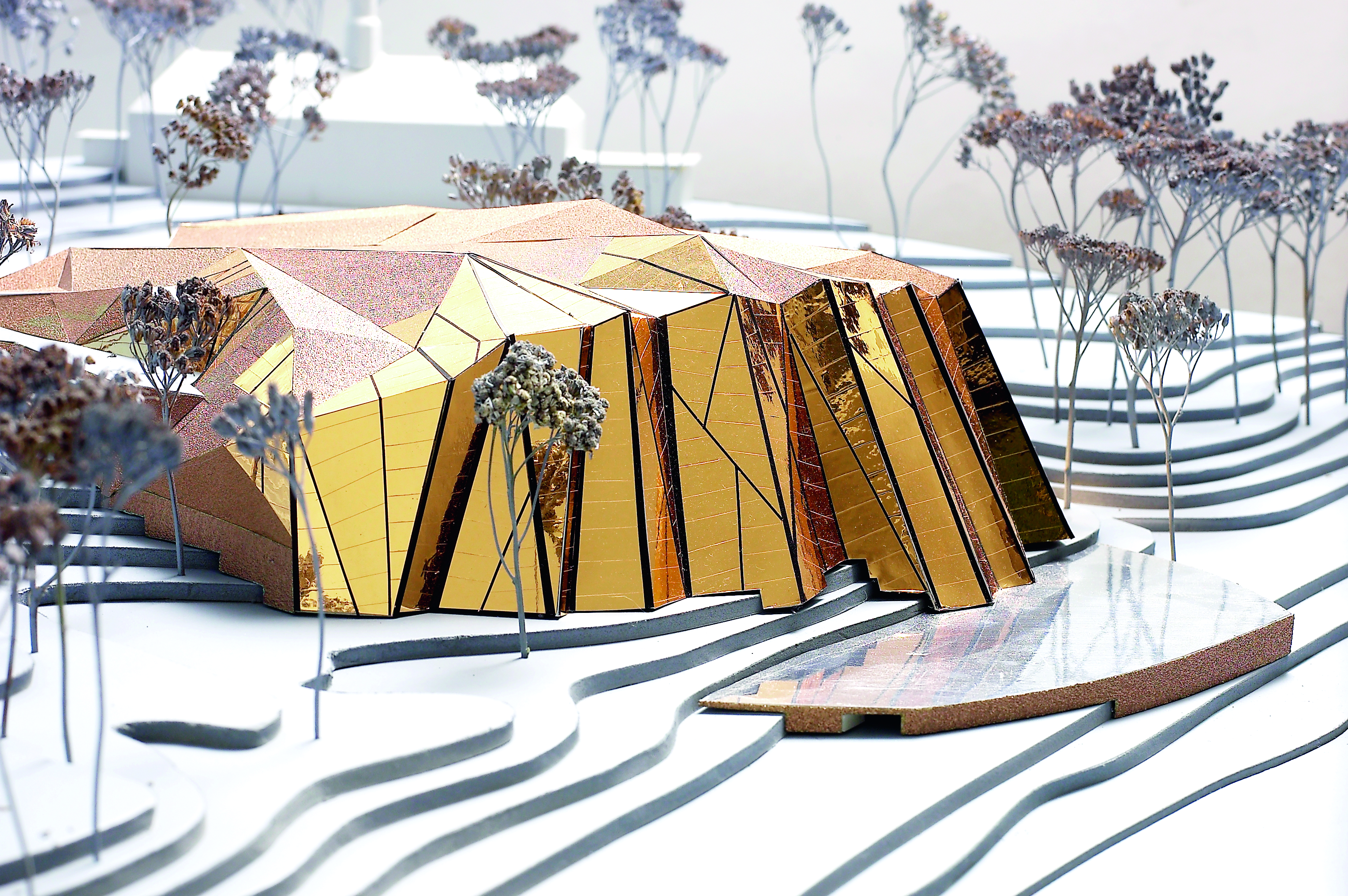

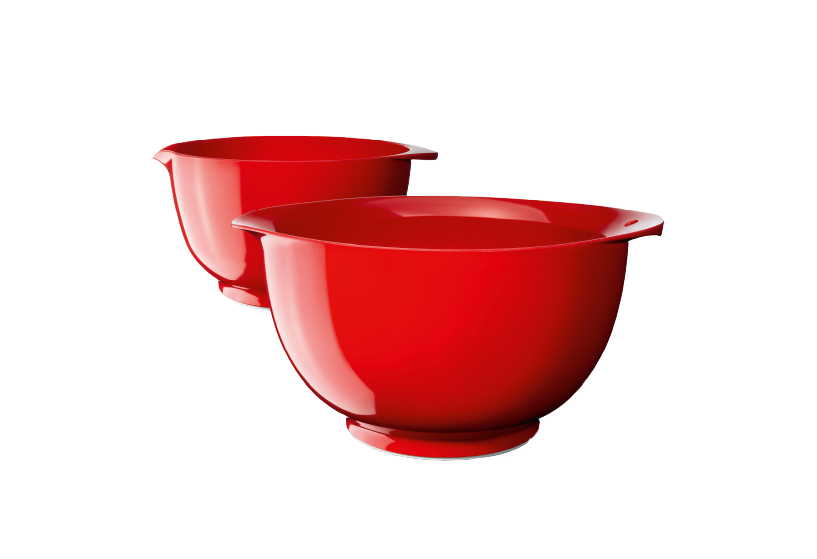

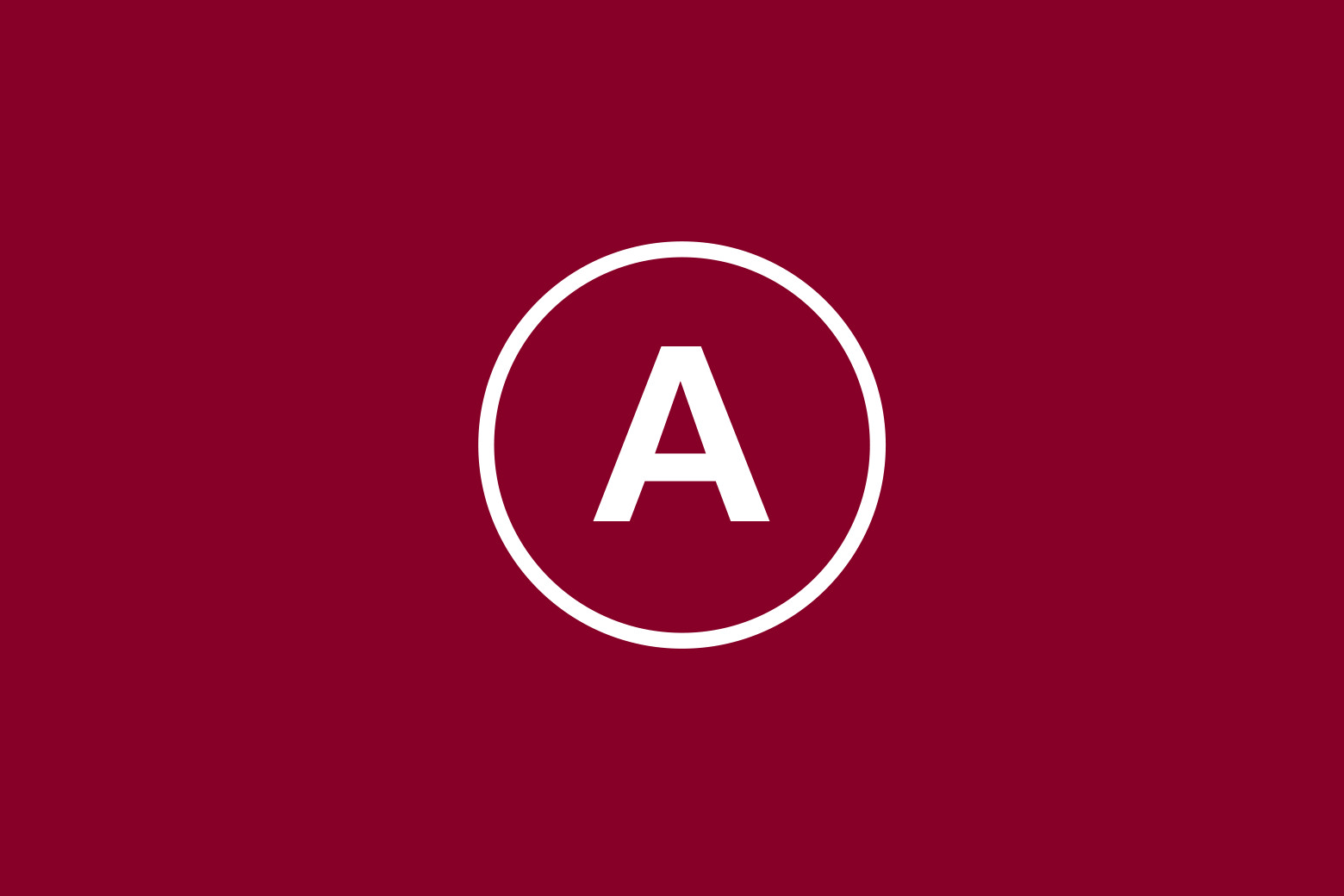

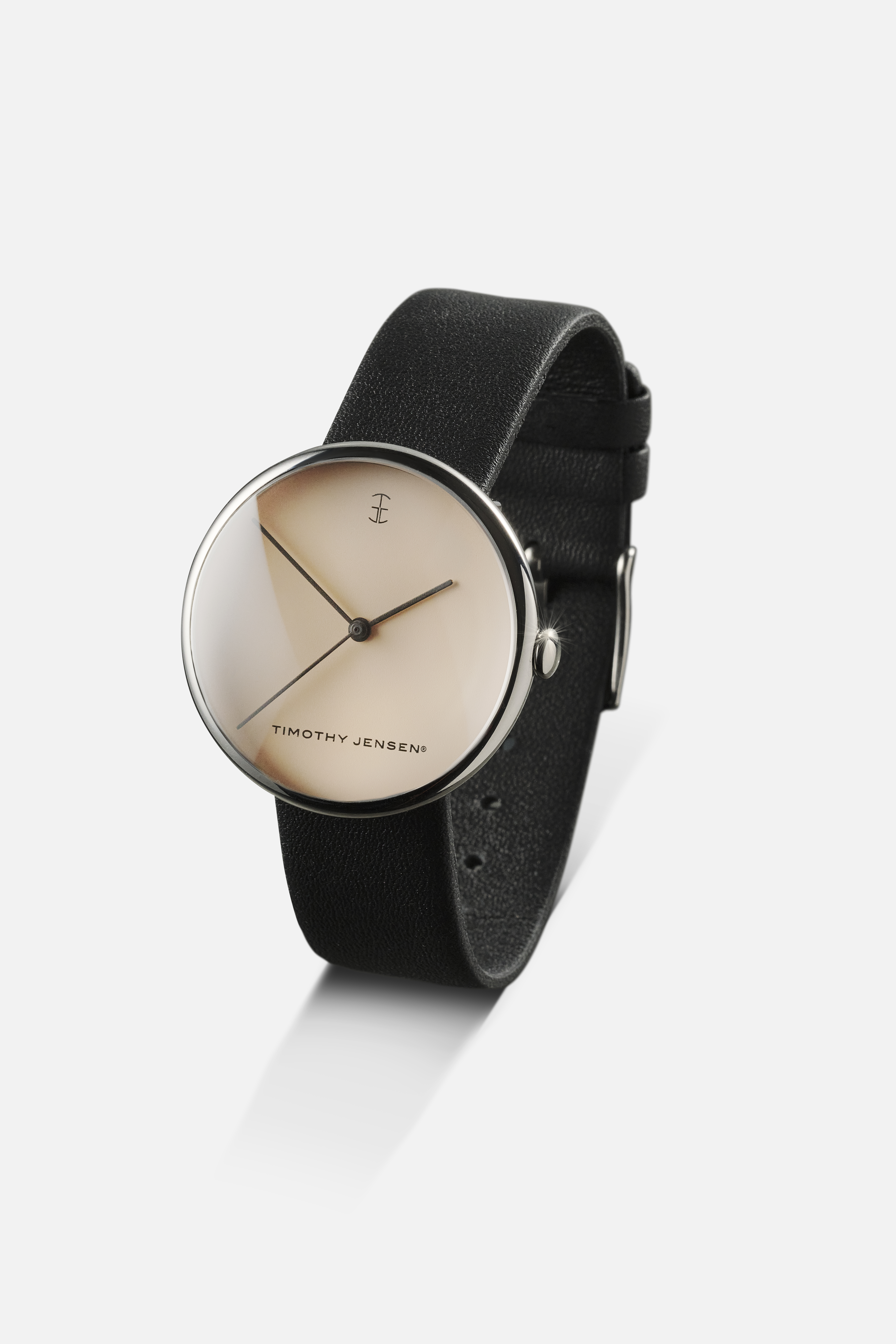

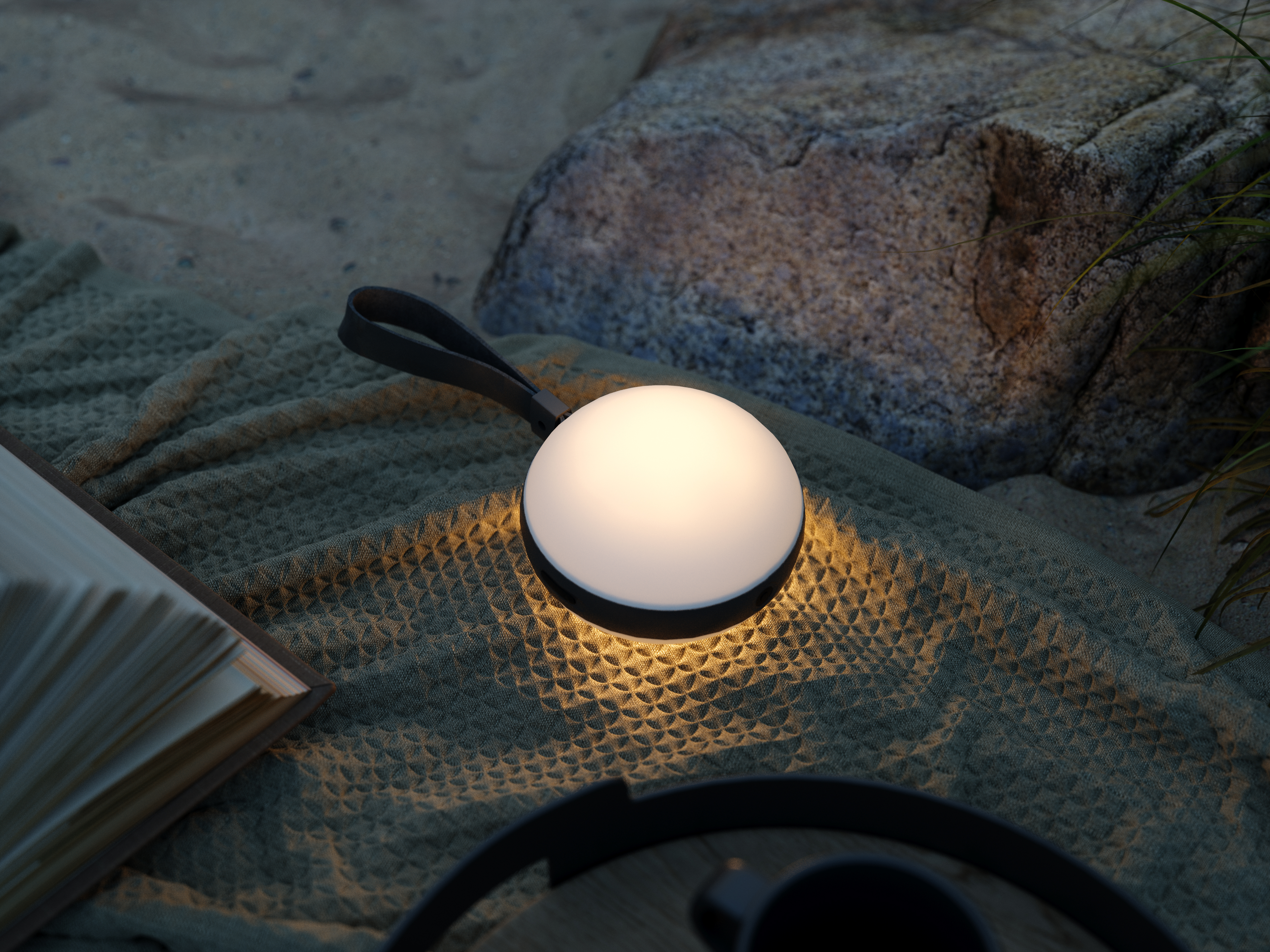

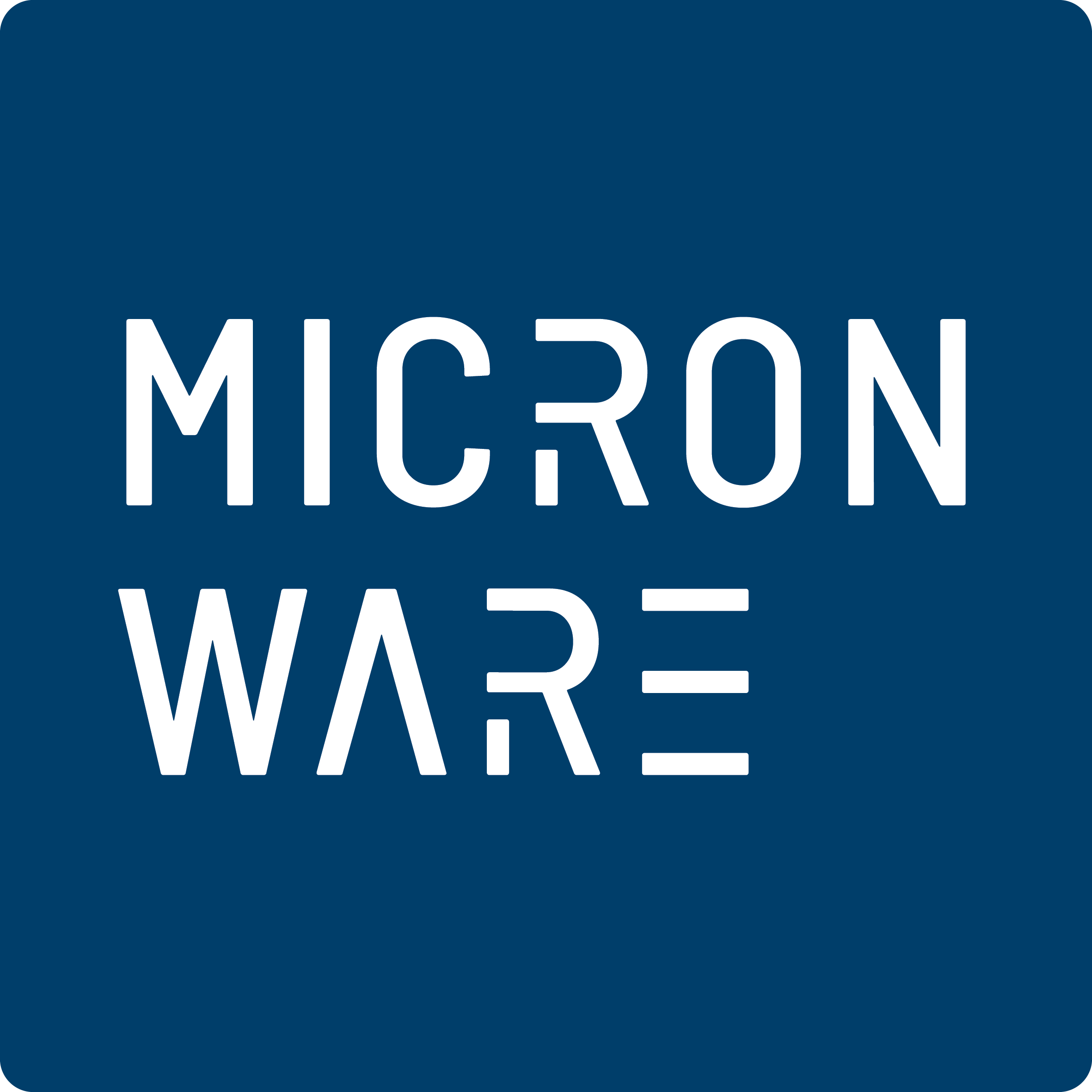

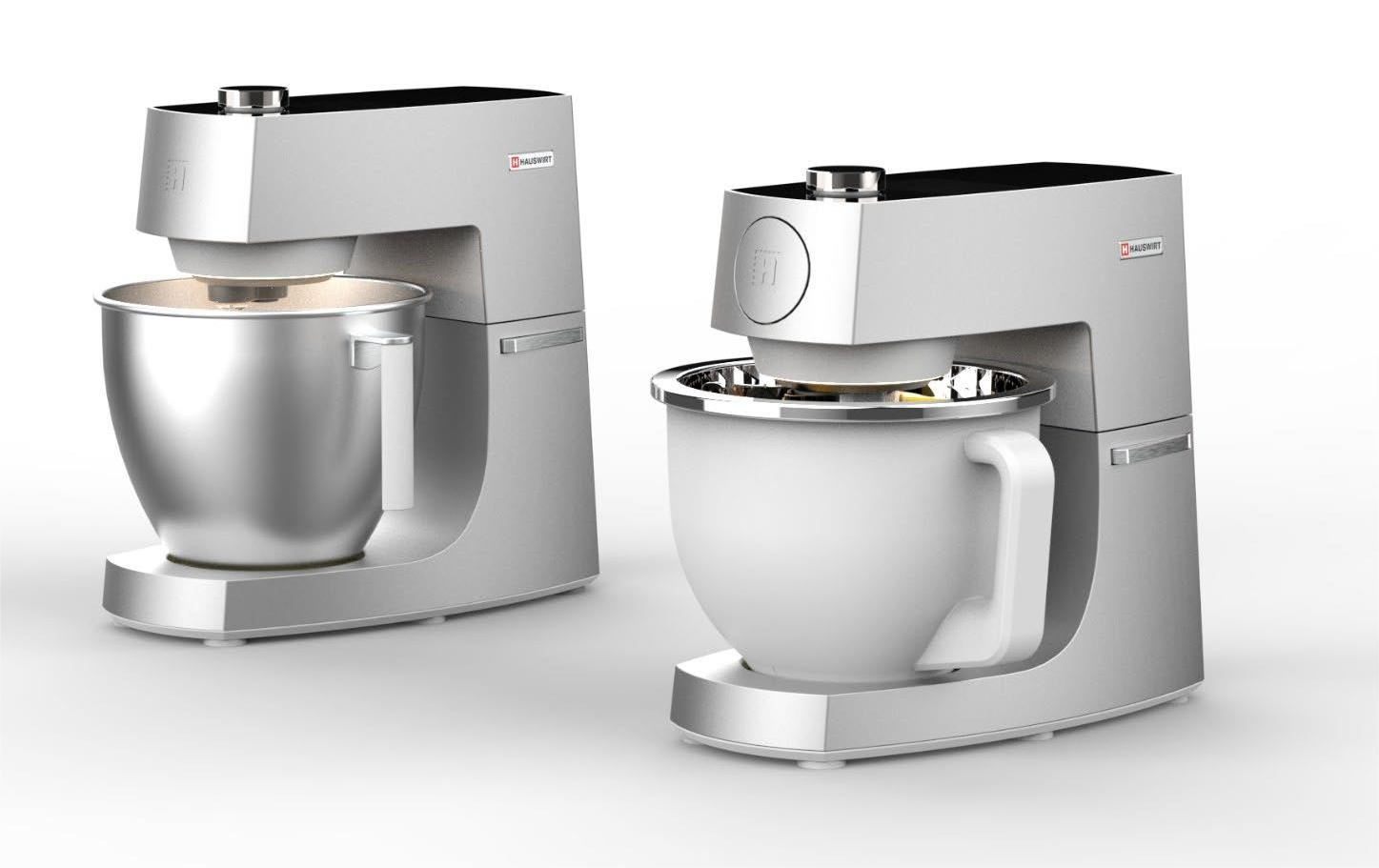

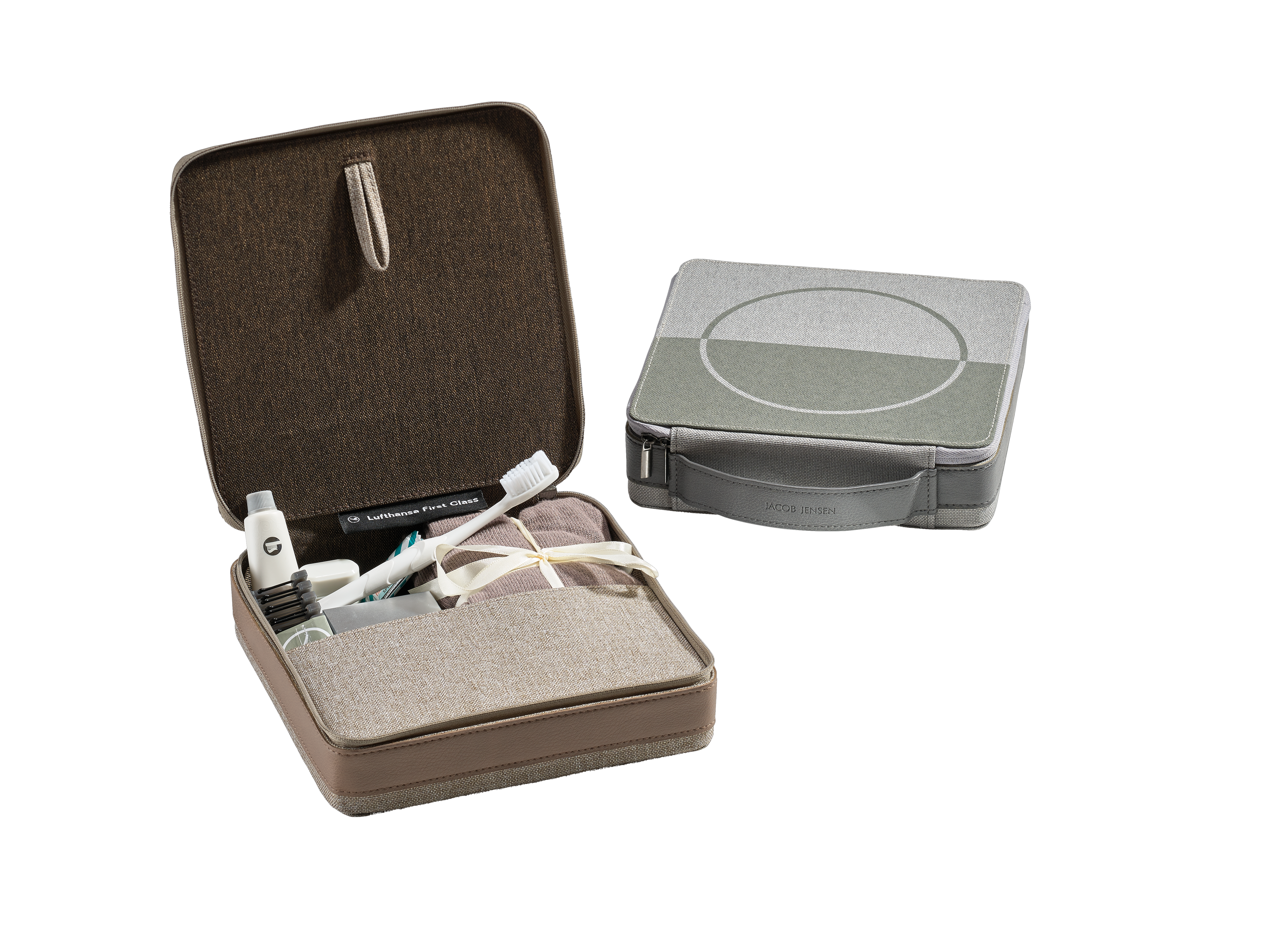

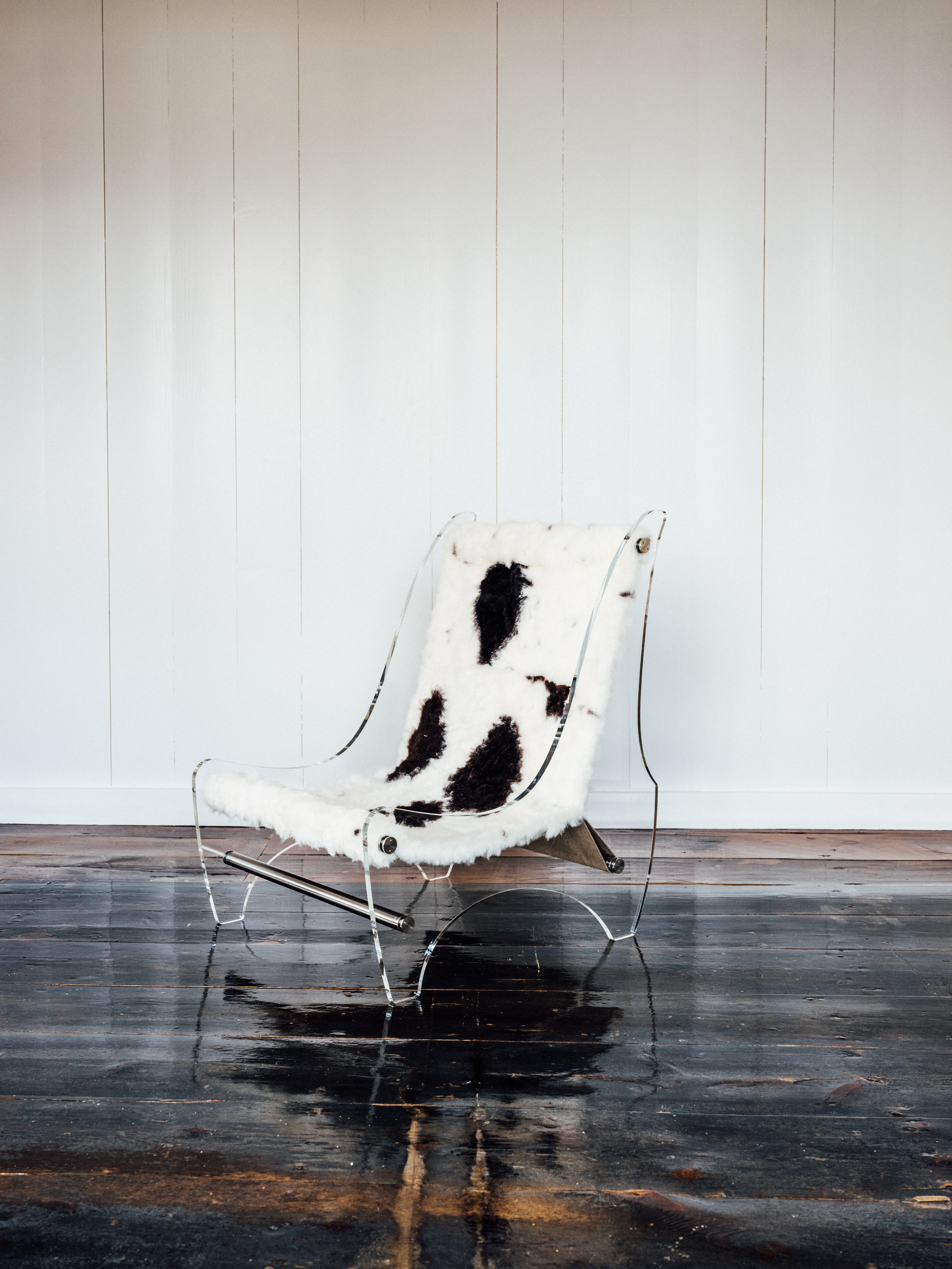

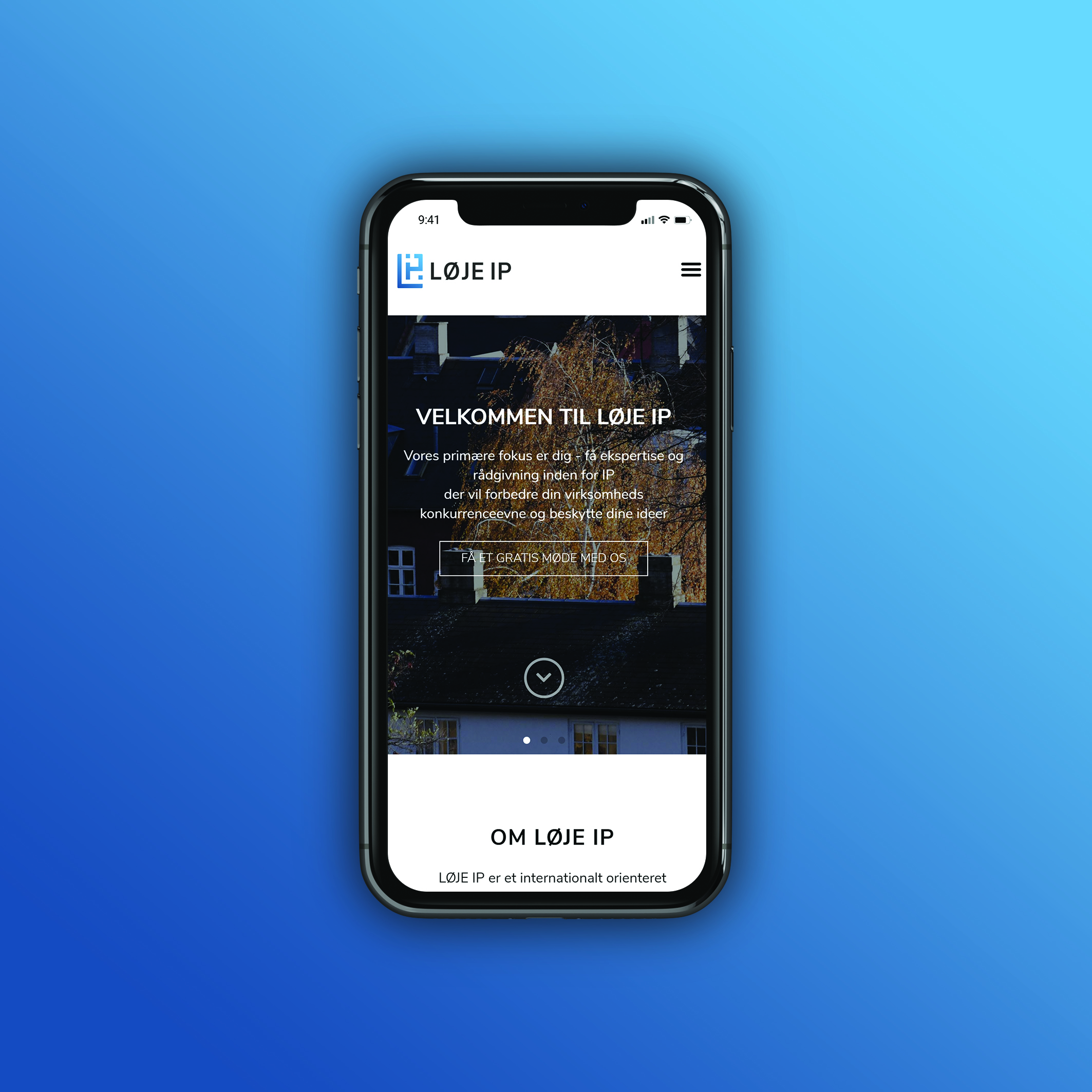

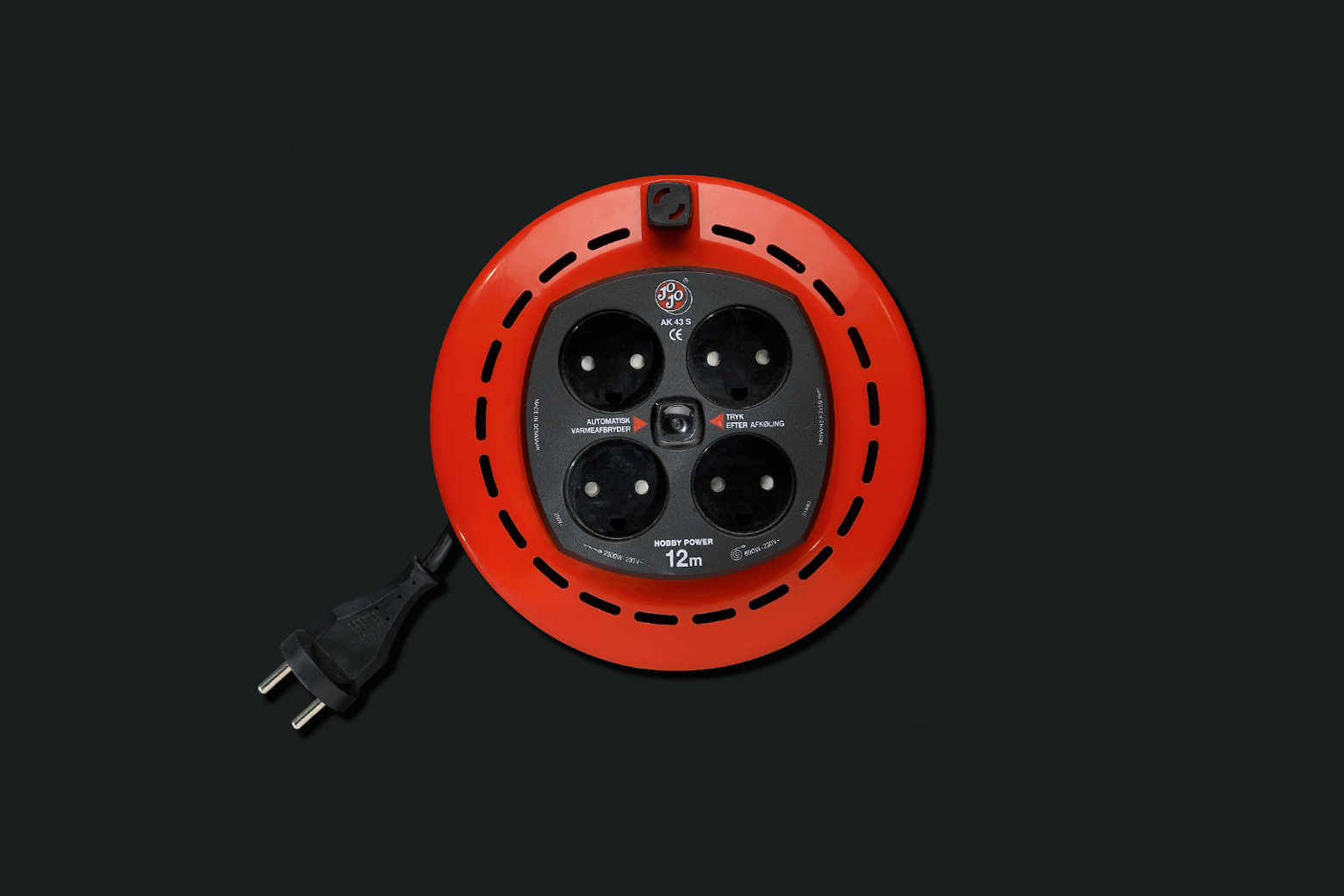

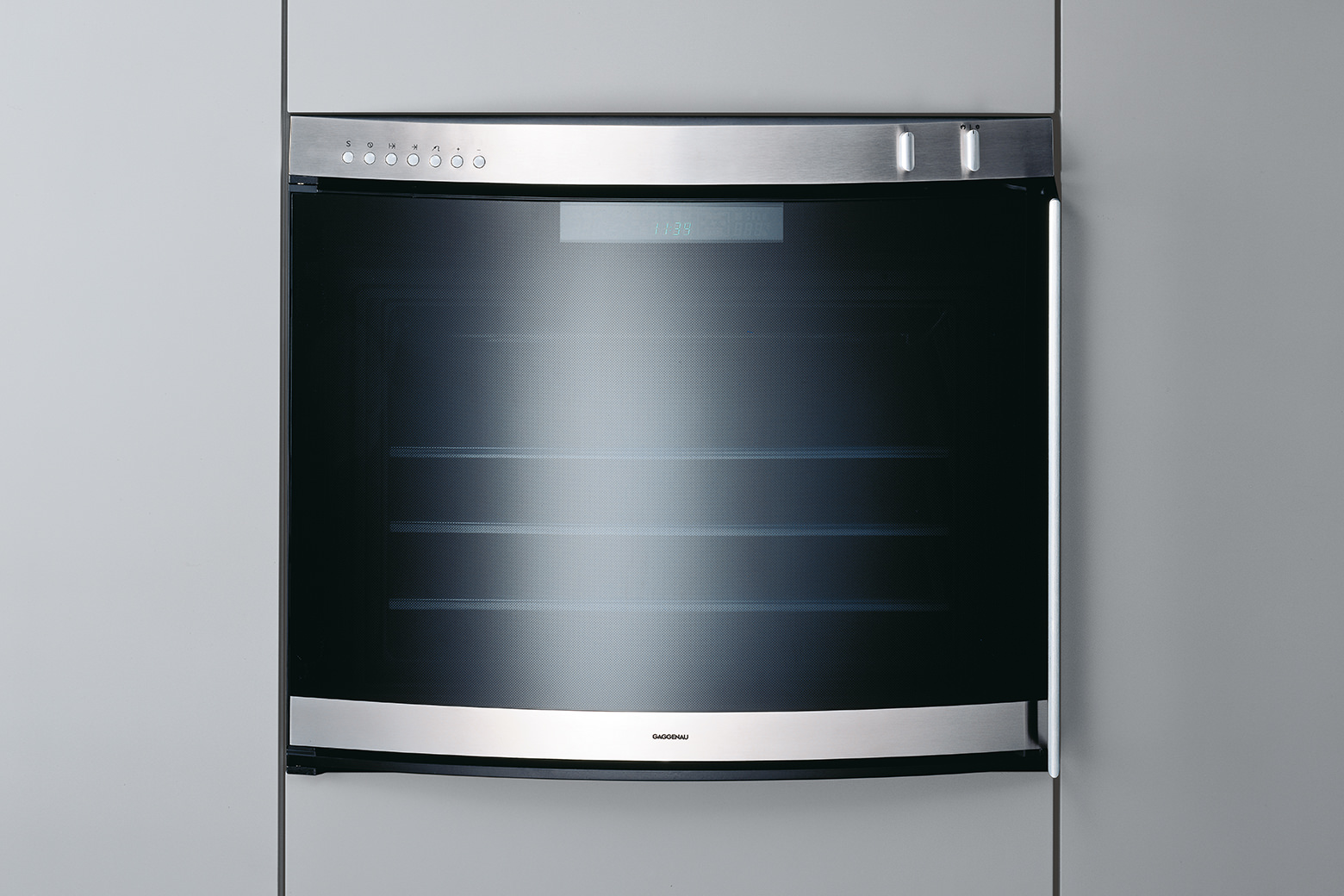

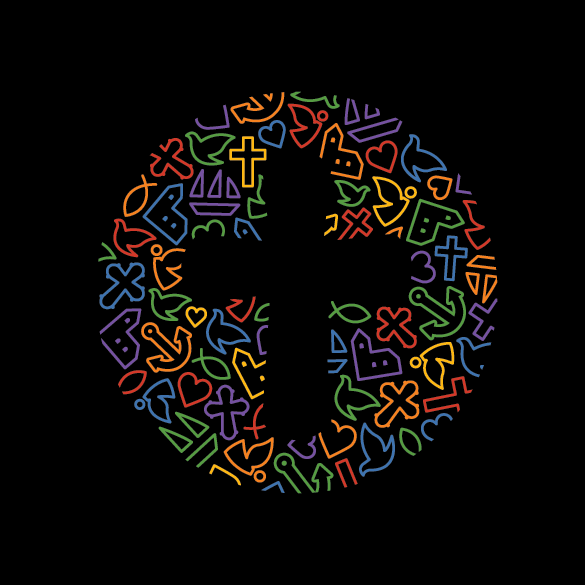

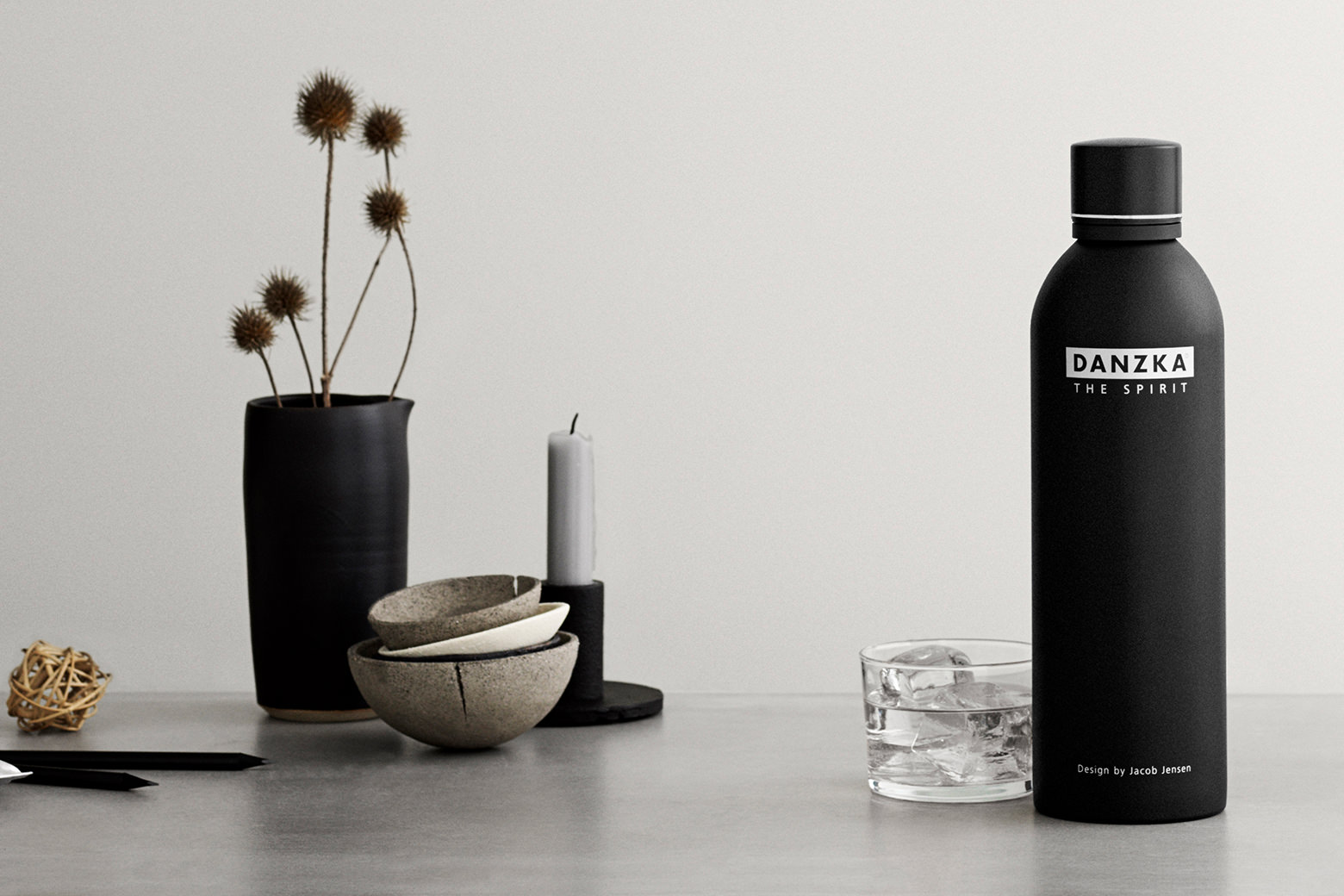

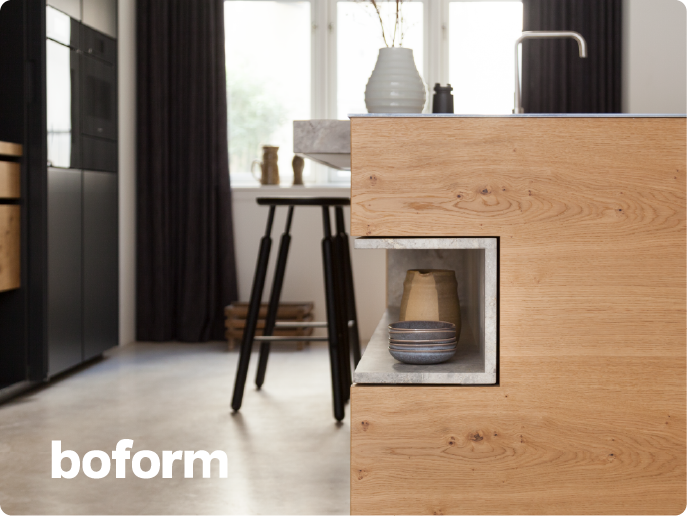

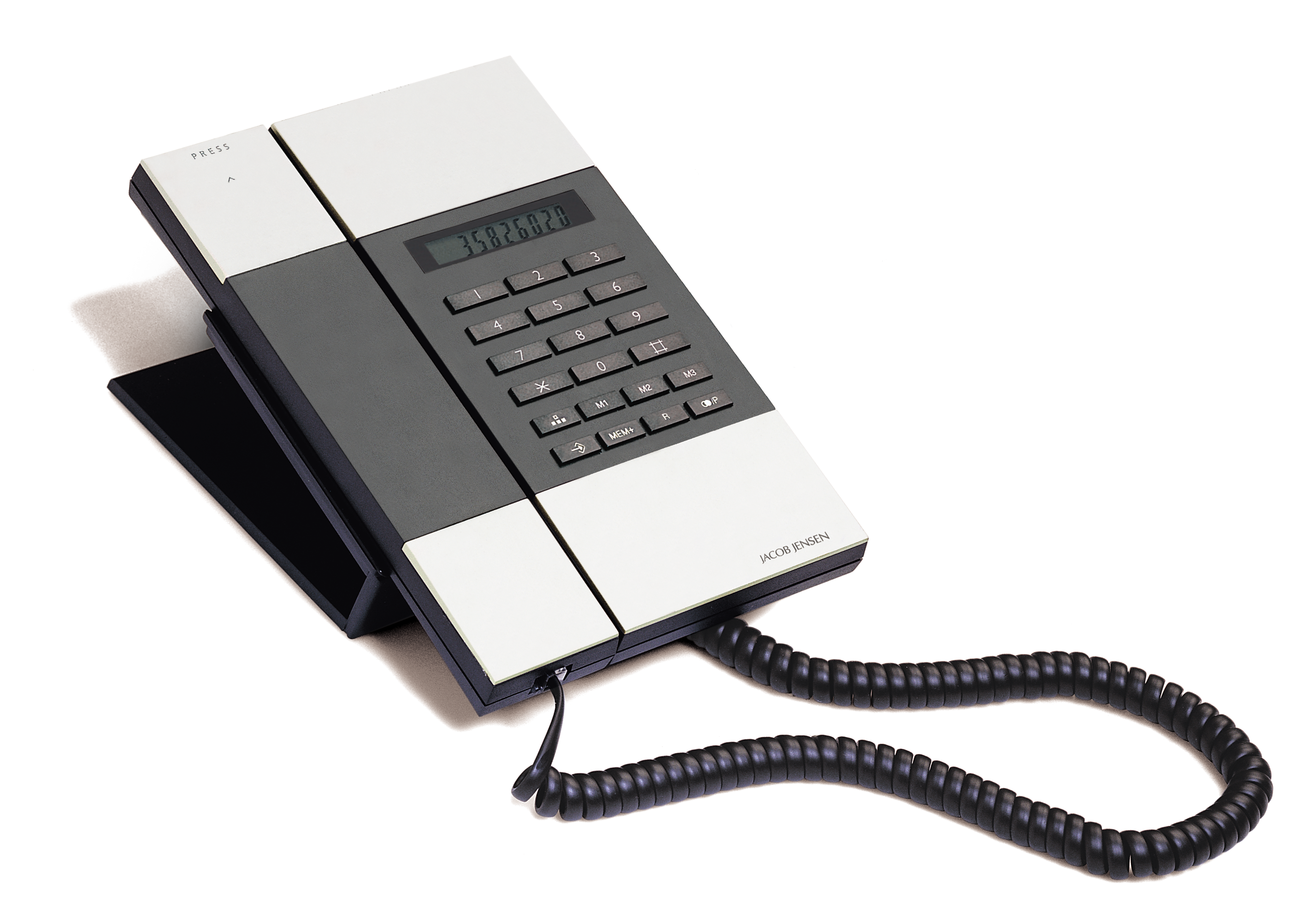

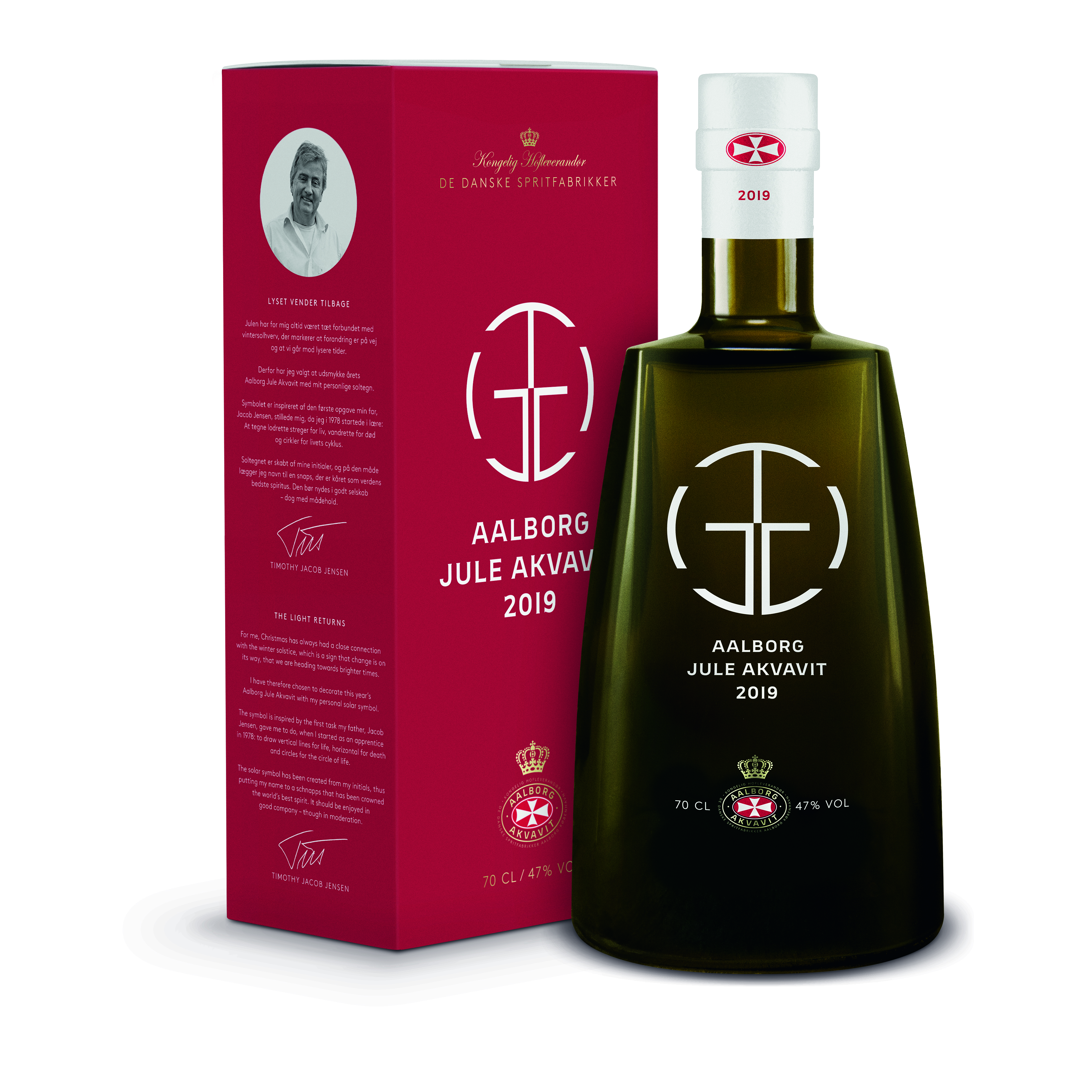

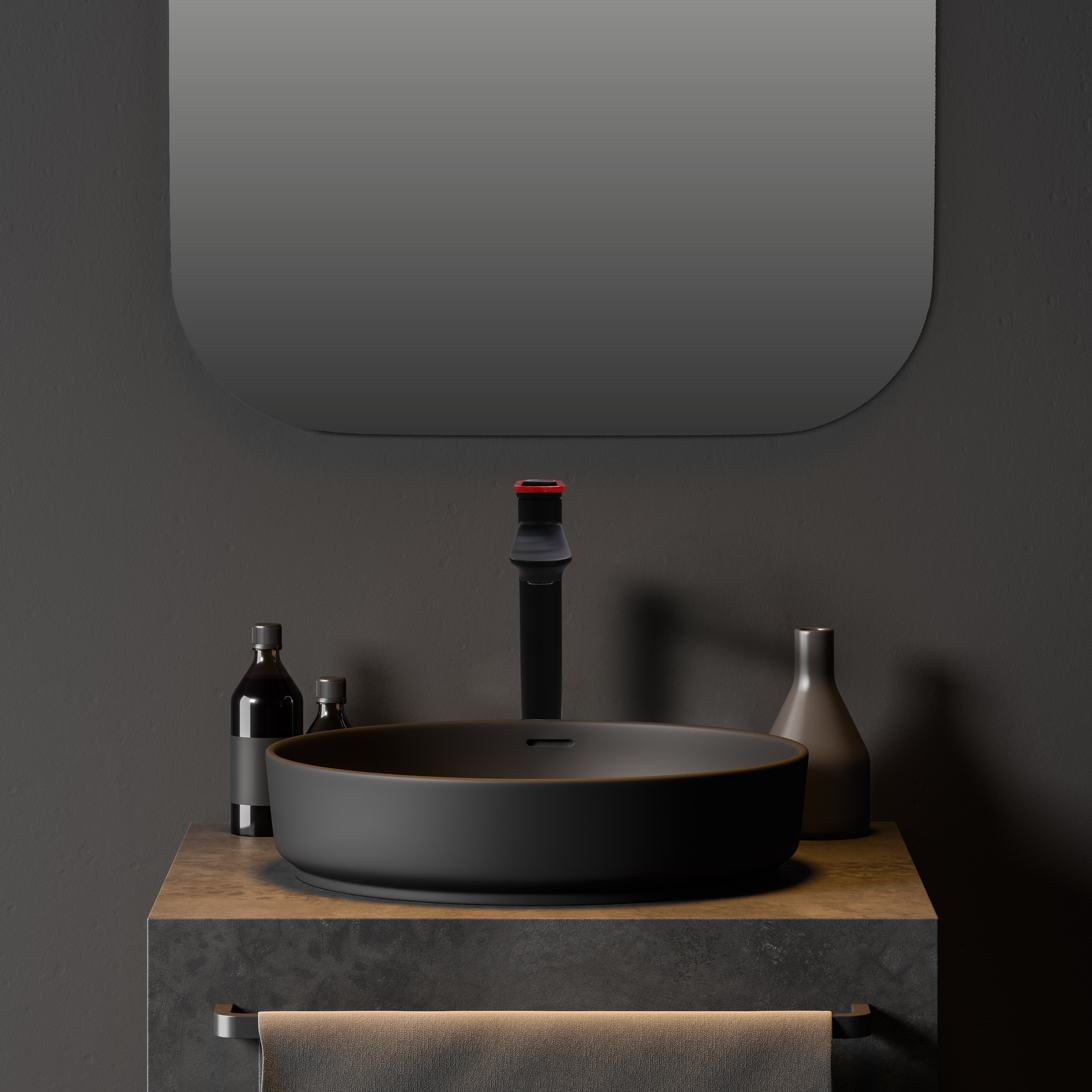

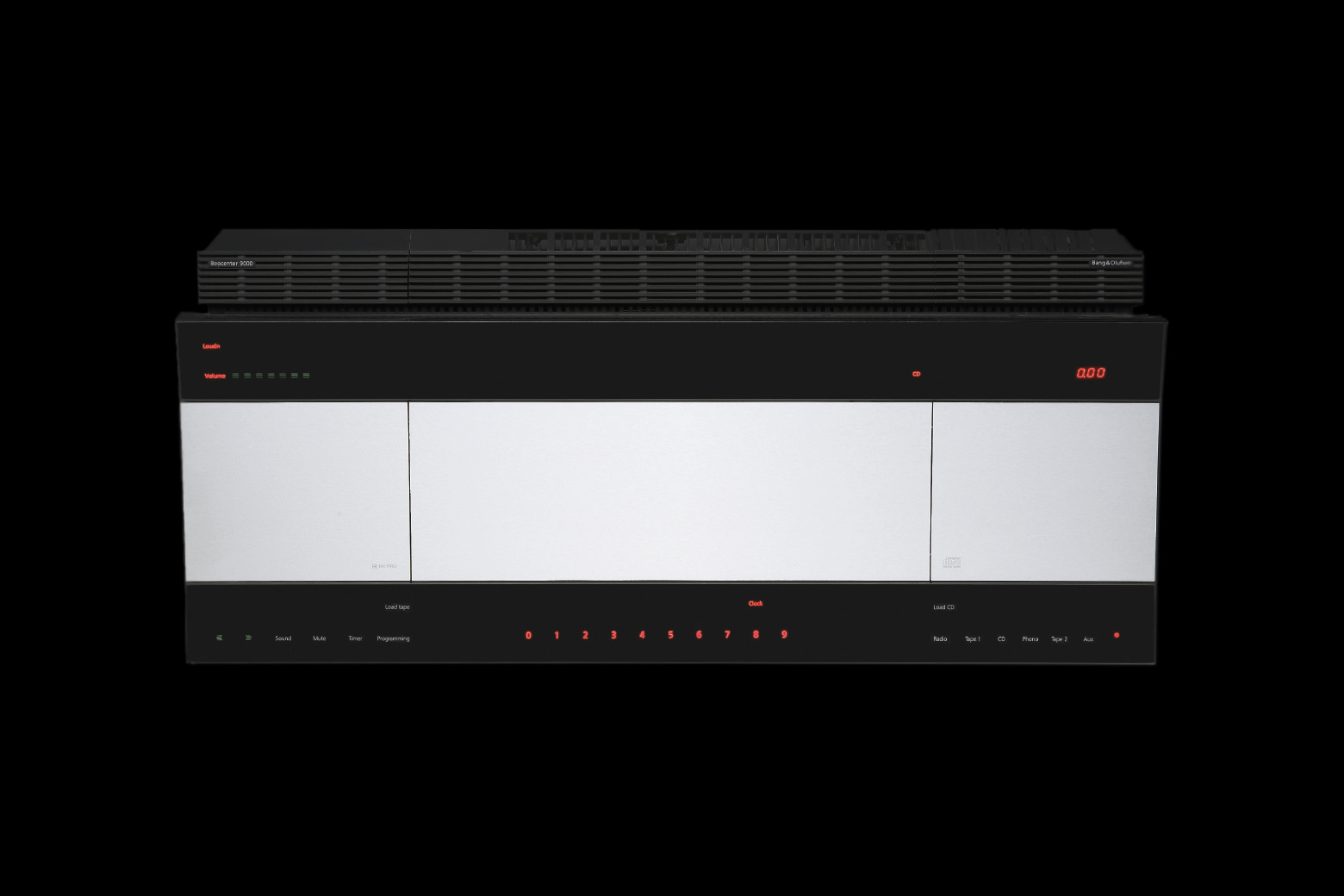

== Awards ==
- Red Dot Award (1993–2017, Germany)
- China Red Star Design Award (2013–2017, China)
- IF Award (1990–2018, Germany)
- German Design Award (2012–2017, Germany)
- Designer of the Year (2017, China).
- Design Plus Award (1988–2016, Germany)
- IDA Awards, (2016, U.S.)
- Plus X Award (2006–2016, Germany)
- German Design Award (2012–2018, Germany)
- Good Design Award (1985–2012, Japan)

== Personal life ==
Timothy Jacob Jensen has two daughters, Toko and Freja.
