= Jacob Jensen =

Danish industrial designer

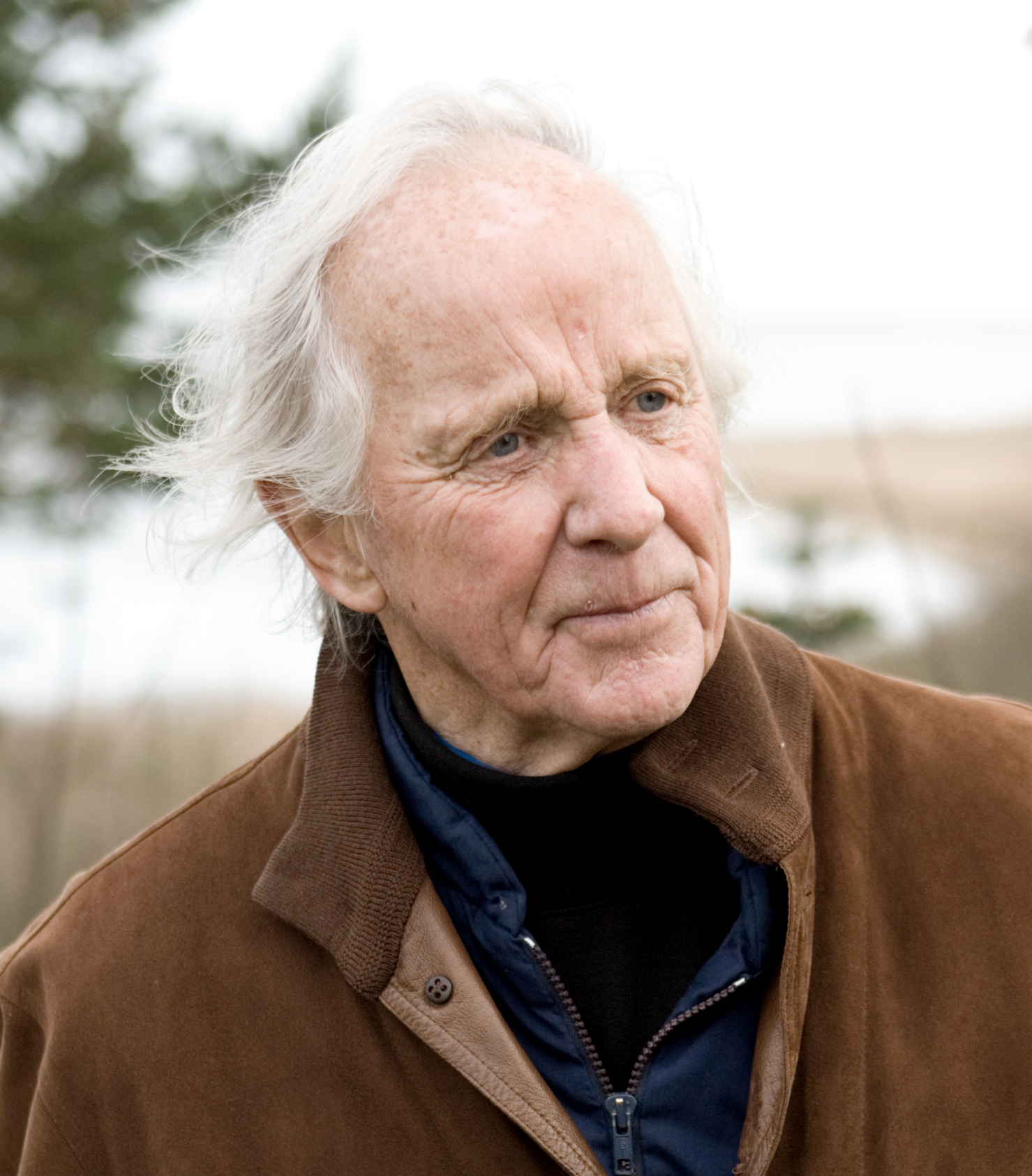
- Died: 15 May 2015 (aged 89); Virksund, Denmark
- Education: School of Arts and Crafts (Denmark)
- Known for: Industrial design
- Movement: Danish modern
- Children: Thomas Ryan Jensen Katja Ryan Hopwood Timothy Jacob Jensen Troels Jakob Jensen Toke Jakob Jensen
- Website: http://jacobjensendesign.com/

Jacob Jensen (29 April 1926 – 15 May 2015) was a Danish industrial designer best known for his work with Bang & Olufsen. Jensen designed numerous popular high-end consumer products, developing a functional minimalism style that formed a prominent part of the Danish modern movement. In 1958 he founded the Jacob Jensen Design Studio. Jensen designed for other brands including Alcatel, Kirk, Boform, General Electric, International Gift Corporation, JO-JO, Labofa, Rodenstock, Rosti (Rosti Mepal), and Stentofon. His works have been featured at the Museum of Modern Art (MoMA) in New York City, and have received numerous design awards.

== Life and career ==
Jacob Jensen was born in 1926 in Copenhagen. Son of Olga and Alfred Jensen, he left school after the seventh grade and completed training as an upholsterer. In 1947 he began working in his father's shop where he designed chairs. In 1948 he attended the School of Arts and Crafts (Danmarks Designskole) where he enrolled in the furniture design department. In 1952 he became the first student to graduate from the institution's Industrial Design program (founded by Jørn Utzon), which focused on mass-produced objects for everyday use.

From 1952 to 1958, Jensen worked at Copenhagen studio Bernadotte & Bjørn (the first industrial design drawing office in Denmark) as an industrial designer. During his time there he designed various works including the Margrethe Bowl for company Rosti (Rosti Mepal), which became Jensen's first financial success. This was followed by a period in New York City working with Raymond Loewy. He also spent some time in Chicago with industrial design firm Latham, Tyler & Jensen.

In 1964 he started working as a designer for Bang & Olufsen. During this time Jensen became known for designing audio components of characteristic styles that involved 2-dimensional flattened surfaces with streamlined silver and black designs. He also worked in collaboration with various other companies where he designed wristwatches, kitchen appliances, telephones, chairs, and other products. Jensen is credited with developing the B&O design style, which is still used today. Many of Jensen's designs have been included in permanent design collections at museums around the world. Jacob Jensen died on May 15, 2015, in Virksund, Denmark.

== Bang & Olufsen ==
In 1964 Jensen started working as chief product designer for Bang & Olufsen, an established Danish manufacturer of high-end home electronic products. By 1970s, Bang & Olufsen had received numerous awards for its product designs. The company devised a new slogan, “We think differently,” which was meant to embody the characteristics that made Bang & Olufsen different from other companies at the time. The company's new products and slogan led to an identification of what Bang & Olufsen referred to as the Seven Corporate Identity Components. These principles, which underpinned an approach to the company's product design, included Authenticity, Autovisuality, Credibility, Domesticity, Essentiality, Individuality, and Inventiveness.

Through his time at Bang & Olufsen, Jensen developed over 200 products for the company. During this time he established a minimalistic, horizontal, and severe design style that became characteristic of his product designs. His style involved using brushed aluminium, white and black plastic, smooth surfaces, futuristic controls, and simple shapes for products including amplifiers, speakers, tuners, turntables and other products. He redesigned standard knobs and dials, replacing them with clear-plastic panels, wafer-thin push buttons, and other innovative elements. Jensen is recognized as Bang & Olufsen’s minimal design idiom, and worked with the company until 1991.

== The Jacob Jensen Design Studio ==
In 1958 Jensen opened his own studio in Strandgade, Copenhagen. During this time Jensen designed for General Electric. In 1966, Jacob Jensen Design moved to its present location in Hejlskov (Limfjord), where he designed over 200 products. This included radios, speakers, turntables, and other artefacts. Jensen’s son, Timothy Jacob Jensen, became his father’s apprentice in 1978.

In 1990, his son Timothy Jacob Jensen became chief executive and chief designer of Jacob Jensen Design, and expanded the company internationally. He left Jacob Jensen Design in 2018 and is no longer connected to the company. The studio continues to focus on industrial design, and has branches in Denmark, China, and Thailand.

In 2011 Lars Kolind became Chairman of Jacob Jensen Design, and in 2018 became a majority shareholder.

== Design style ==
Jacob Jensen is considered a prominent contributor to the mid-century Danish Modern movement, alongside Danish artists including Mogens Koch, Jørn Utzon, Arne Jacobsen, and Poul Henningsen. Using influences from Raymond Loewy’s consumer-friendly designs and his experience designing for Bang & Olufsen, Jensen merged International design (an architectural design from the U.S.) and the Maya principle (Most Advanced Yet Acceptable). He labeled this design language “Different but not strange.” Jensen applied this design language to brands including Alcatel, Kirk, General Electric, JO-JO, Labofa, Stentofon. Jensen's maxim was that household objects deserve the same attention as luxurious of high-end consumer gadgets.

== Working method ==
Jensen described his approach to design as analogous to:

“constructing a fountain pen, writing a poem, producing a play or designing a locomotive, all demand the same components, the same ingredients: perspective, creativity, new ideas, understanding and first and foremost, the ability to rework, almost infinitely, over and over. That ‘over and over’ is for me the cruelest torture.”

“The only way I can work,” he continued, “is to make 30-40 models before I find the right one. The question is, when do you find the right one? My method is, when I have reached a point where I think, O.K., that’s it, there it is, I put the model on a table in the living room, illuminate it, and otherwise spend the evening as usual, and go to bed. The next morning I go in and look at it, knowing with 100 percent certainty that I have 6-7 seconds to see and decide whether it’s right or wrong.”

“If I look at it longer, I automatically compensate. ‘Oh, it’s not too high,’ and ‘It’s not so bad.’ There are only those 6–7 seconds; then I make some notes as to what's wrong. Finished. After breakfast, I make the changes. That's the only way I know.”

== MoMA exhibition ==
In 1978, New York’s Museum of Modern Art (MoMA) featured a full exhibition on Jacob Jensen’s designs for Bang & Olufsen. The exhibition was titled “Bang & Olufsen—Design for Sound by Jacob Jensen”, and featured 28 audio artefacts.

Critic Paul Goldberger described the exhibition in the New York Times as “among the most beautiful mass-produced objects ever made available in the United States.” 17 of Jensen's works have remained part of the museum's permanent collection.

== Works ==
Jacob Jensen's most renowned works include Beolit radio (1970), Beogram 4000 (1972) and Beomaster 1900, BeoVox 2500 speakers (designed for Bang & Olufsen). Other well-known works include office chairs (designed for Labofa A/S), Margrethe Bowl, Kirk 76E telephone, kitchen appliances, Viking sculptures, telephone designs, the Jensen-One cars for Max Rene Ltd., and loudspeakers for Dantax A/S.

== Awards ==
- Chair Bronze medal by HRH King Frederik IX of Denmark (1949)
- IF. Industrie Forum Design Awards (various from 1966 – 1991)
- ND Norsk Design (various from 1969 - 1991)
- Japan Grand Prize (1976)
- Fortune Award (1977)
- I.D.S.A. Award (1978)
- Thorvald Bindesbøll Medal (1983)
- International Design Award (1985)
- Good Design Award (various from 1985 - 1990)
- ID Industrial Design (various from 1972 - 1996)
- Knighted with the Knights Cross of the Order of Dannebrog (1996)
- Foreign Ministry's list inclusion of “Great Danes” (1999)
- The Prince Eugen Medal awarded by King Carl XVI Gustaf of Sweden and Queen Sylvia (2006)
- Lifelong honorary grant from the Danish Arts Foundation (2008)

== See also ==
- Danish Modern
- Jørn Utzon
- Raymond Loewy
- Timothy Jacob Jensen
- International style
