= Steinway Lyngdorf =

Steinway Lyngdorf is a brand name of high-end audio systems produced by Steinway & Sons and Lyngdorf Audio.

== History ==
Lyngdorf Audio is a Danish audio system company founded in Denmark in 2005 by Peter Lyngdorf. It is currently managed by director Thomas Birkelund. The company produces audio systems including loudspeakers and amplifiers. In 2007, piano maker Steinway & Sons gave the company exclusive rights to manufacture audio systems under the name Steinway Lyngdorf.

== Products ==
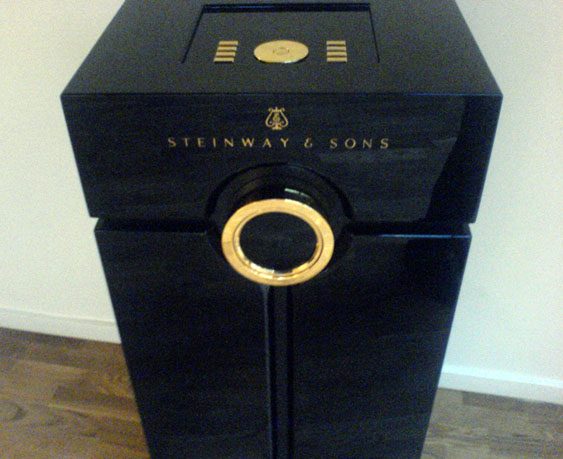
Steinway Lyngdorf Model D, head unit

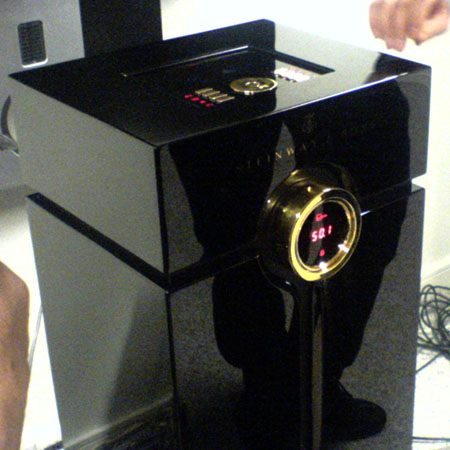
Steinway Lyngdorf Model D, head unit

The companies goal was to reproduce the sound of a Steinway & Sons grand piano so that pianists could not tell whether they were listening to a real piano or a recording.

Speakers include an advanced version of Lyngdorf's RoomPerfect technology, which, the company claims, enables the systems to adapt to the acoustic characteristics of any listening environment. The systems are composed partly of gold, brass and aluminum. Each loudspeaker weighs 174 kg. The systems are handmade and it takes more than 170 hours to assemble each system.
